Mohandas Karamchand Gandhi (2 October 1869 – 30 January 1948) was an Indian lawyer, anti-colonial nationalist and political ethicist famous for his nonviolent resistance. He lead the successful campaign for India's independence from British rule, and later inspired movements for civil rights and freedom across the world. The honorific Mahātmā (Sanskrit: "great-souled", "venerable"), first applied to him in 1914 in South Africa, is now used throughout the world.

Born and raised in a Hindu family in coastal Gujarat, Gandhi trained in the law at the Inner Temple, London, and was called to the bar at age 22 in June 1891. After two uncertain years in India, where he was unable to start a successful law practice, he moved to South Africa in 1893 to represent an Indian merchant in a lawsuit. He went on to live in South Africa for 21 years. It was here that Gandhi raised a family and first employed nonviolent resistance in a campaign for civil rights. In 1915, aged 45, he returned to India and soon set about organising peasants, farmers, and urban labourers to protest against excessive land-tax and discrimination.

Assuming leadership of the Indian National Congress in 1921, Gandhi led nationwide campaigns for easing poverty, expanding women's rights, building religious and ethnic amity, ending untouchability, and, above all, achieving swaraj or self-rule. Gandhi adopted the short dhoti woven with hand-spun yarn as a mark of identification with India's rural poor. He began to live in a self-sufficient residential community, to eat simple food, and undertake long fasts as a means of both introspection and political protest. Bringing anti-colonial nationalism to the common Indians, Gandhi led them in challenging the British-imposed salt tax with the  Dandi Salt March in 1930 and in calling for the British to quit India in 1942. He was imprisoned many times and for many years in both South Africa and India.

Gandhi's vision of an independent India based on religious pluralism was challenged in the early 1940s by a Muslim nationalism which demanded a separate homeland for Muslims within British India. In August 1947, Britain granted independence, but the British Indian Empire was partitioned into two dominions, a Hindu-majority India and a Muslim-majority Pakistan. As many displaced Hindus, Muslims, and Sikhs made their way to their new lands, religious violence broke out, especially in the Punjab and Bengal. Abstaining from the official celebration of independence, Gandhi visited the affected areas, attempting to alleviate distress. In the months following, he undertook several hunger strikes to stop the religious violence. The last of these, begun in Delhi on 12 January 1948 when he was 78, also had the indirect goal of pressuring India to pay out some cash assets owed to Pakistan, which the Indian government, had been resisting. Although the Government of India relented, as did the religious rioters, the belief that Gandhi had been too resolute in his defence of both Pakistan and Indian Muslims, spread among some Hindus in India. Among these was Nathuram Godse, a militant Hindu nationalist from Pune, western India, who assassinated Gandhi by firing three bullets into his chest at an interfaith prayer meeting in Delhi on 30 January 1948.

Gandhi's birthday, 2 October, is commemorated in India as Gandhi Jayanti, a national holiday, and worldwide as the International Day of Nonviolence. Gandhi is considered the Father of the Nation in India and was commonly called Bapu (Gujarati: endearment for father, papa).

Biography

Early life and background 
Mohandas Karamchand Gandhi was born on 2 October 1869 into a Gujarati Hindu Modh Bania family in Porbandar (also known as Sudamapuri), a coastal town on the Kathiawar Peninsula and then part of the small princely state of Porbandar in the Kathiawar Agency of the British Raj. His father, Karamchand Uttamchand Gandhi (1822–1885), served as the dewan (chief minister) of Porbandar state. His family originated from the then village of Kutiana in what was then Junagadh State.

Although he only had an elementary education and had previously been a clerk in the state administration, Karamchand proved a capable chief minister. During his tenure, he married four times. His first two wives died young, after each had given birth to a daughter, and his third marriage was childless. In 1857, he sought his third wife's permission to remarry; that year, he married Putlibai (1844–1891), who also came from Junagadh, and was from a Pranami Vaishnava family. Karamchand and Putlibai had three children over the ensuing decade: a son, Laxmidas (c. 1860–1914); a daughter, Raliatbehn (1862–1960); and another son, Karsandas (c. 1866–1913).

On 2 October 1869, Putlibai gave birth to her last child, Mohandas, in a dark, windowless ground-floor room of the Gandhi family residence in Porbandar city. As a child, Gandhi was described by his sister Raliat as "restless as mercury, either playing or roaming about. One of his favourite pastimes was twisting dogs' ears." The Indian classics, especially the stories of Shravana and king Harishchandra, had a great impact on Gandhi in his childhood. In his autobiography, he states that they left an indelible impression on his mind. He writes: "It haunted me and I must have acted Harishchandra to myself times without number." Gandhi's early self-identification with truth and love as supreme values is traceable to these epic characters.

The family's religious background was eclectic. Gandhi's father Karamchand was Hindu and his mother Putlibai was from a Pranami Vaishnava Hindu family. Gandhi's father was of Modh Baniya caste in the varna of Vaishya. His mother came from the medieval Krishna bhakti-based Pranami tradition, whose religious texts include the Bhagavad Gita, the Bhagavata Purana, and a collection of 14 texts with teachings that the tradition believes to include the essence of the Vedas, the Quran and the Bible. Gandhi was deeply influenced by his mother, an extremely pious lady who "would not think of taking her meals without her daily prayers... she would take the hardest vows and keep them without flinching. To keep two or three consecutive fasts was nothing to her."

In 1874, Gandhi's father Karamchand left Porbandar for the smaller state of Rajkot, where he became a counsellor to its ruler, the Thakur Sahib; though Rajkot was a less prestigious state than Porbandar, the British regional political agency was located there, which gave the state's diwan a measure of security. In 1876, Karamchand became diwan of Rajkot and was succeeded as diwan of Porbandar by his brother Tulsidas. His family then rejoined him in Rajkot.

At age 9, Gandhi entered the local school in Rajkot, near his home. There, he studied the rudiments of arithmetic, history, the Gujarati language and geography. At the age of 11, he joined the High School in Rajkot, Alfred High School. He was an average student, won some prizes, but was a shy and tongue tied student, with no interest in games; his only companions were books and school lessons.

In May 1883, the 13-year-old Mohandas was married to 14-year-old Kasturbai Makhanji Kapadia (her first name was usually shortened to "Kasturba", and affectionately to "Ba") in an arranged marriage, according to the custom of the region at that time. In the process, he lost a year at school but was later allowed to make up by accelerating his studies. His wedding was a joint event, where his brother and cousin were also married. Recalling the day of their marriage, he once said, "As we didn't know much about marriage, for us it meant only wearing new clothes, eating sweets and playing with relatives." As was the prevailing tradition, the adolescent bride was to spend much time at her parents' house, and away from her husband.

Writing many years later, Mohandas described with regret the lustful feelings he felt for his young bride: "even at school I used to think of her, and the thought of nightfall and our subsequent meeting was ever haunting me." He later recalled feeling jealous and possessive of her, such as when she would visit a temple with her girlfriends, and being sexually lustful in his feelings for her.

In late 1885, Gandhi's father Karamchand died. Gandhi, then 16 years old, and his wife of age 17 had their first baby, who survived only a few days. The two deaths anguished Gandhi. The Gandhi couple had four more children, all sons: Harilal, born in 1888; Manilal, born in 1892; Ramdas, born in 1897; and Devdas, born in 1900.

In November 1887, the 18-year-old Gandhi graduated from high school in Ahmedabad. In January 1888, he enrolled at Samaldas College in Bhavnagar State, then the sole degree-granting institution of higher education in the region. However, he dropped out, and returned to his family in Porbandar.

Three years in London

Student of law 

Gandhi had dropped out of the cheapest college he could afford in Bombay. Mavji Dave Joshiji, a Brahmin priest and family friend, advised Gandhi and his family that he should consider law studies in London. In July 1888, his wife Kasturba gave birth to their first surviving son, Harilal. His mother was not comfortable about Gandhi leaving his wife and family, and going so far from home. Gandhi's uncle Tulsidas also tried to dissuade his nephew. Gandhi wanted to go. To persuade his wife and mother, Gandhi made a vow in front of his mother that he would abstain from meat, alcohol and women. Gandhi's brother Laxmidas, who was already a lawyer, cheered Gandhi's London studies plan and offered to support him. Putlibai gave Gandhi her permission and blessing.

On 10 August 1888, Gandhi aged 18, left Porbandar for Mumbai, then known as Bombay. Upon arrival, he stayed with the local Modh Bania community whose elders warned him that England would tempt him to compromise his religion, and eat and drink in Western ways. Despite Gandhi informing them of his promise to his mother and her blessings, he was excommunicated from his caste. Gandhi ignored this, and on 4 September, he sailed from Bombay to London, with his brother seeing him off. Gandhi attended University College, London, where he took classes in English literature with Henry Morley in 1888–1889.

He also enrolled at Inner Temple with the intention of becoming a barrister. His childhood shyness and self-withdrawal had continued through his teens. He retained these traits when he arrived in London, but joined a public speaking practice group and overcame his shyness sufficiently to practise law.

He demonstrated a keen interest in the welfare of London's impoverished dockland communities. In 1889, a bitter trade dispute broke out in London, with dockers striking for better pay and conditions, and seamen, shipbuilders, factory girls and other joining the strike in solidarity. The strikers were successful, in part due to the mediation of Cardinal Manning, leading Gandhi and an Indian friend to make a point of visiting the cardinal and thanking him for his work.

Vegetarianism and committee work 
Gandhi's time in London was influenced by the vow he had made to his mother. He tried to adopt "English" customs, including taking dancing lessons. However, he did not appreciate the bland vegetarian food offered by his landlady and was frequently hungry until he found one of London's few vegetarian restaurants. Influenced by Henry Salt's writing, he joined the London Vegetarian Society, and was elected to its executive committee under the aegis of its president and benefactor Arnold Hills. An achievement while on the committee was the establishment of a Bayswater chapter. Some of the vegetarians he met were members of the Theosophical Society, which had been founded in 1875 to further universal brotherhood, and which was devoted to the study of Buddhist and Hindu literature. They encouraged Gandhi to join them in reading the Bhagavad Gita both in translation as well as in the original.

Gandhi had a friendly and productive relationship with Hills, but the two men took a different view on the continued LVS membership of fellow committee member Thomas Allinson. Their disagreement is the first known example of Gandhi challenging authority, despite his shyness and temperamental disinclination towards confrontation.

Allinson had been promoting newly available birth control methods, but Hills disapproved of these, believing they undermined public morality. He believed vegetarianism to be a moral movement and that Allinson should therefore no longer remain a member of the LVS. Gandhi shared Hills' views on the dangers of birth control, but defended Allinson's right to differ. It would have been hard for Gandhi to challenge Hills; Hills was 12 years his senior and unlike Gandhi, highly eloquent. He bankrolled the LVS and was a captain of industry with his Thames Ironworks company employing more than 6,000 people in the East End of London. He was also a highly accomplished sportsman who later founded the football club West Ham United. In his 1927 An Autobiography, Vol. I, Gandhi wrote:

A motion to remove Allinson was raised, and was debated and voted on by the committee. Gandhi's shyness was an obstacle to his defence of Allinson at the committee meeting. He wrote his views down on paper but shyness prevented him from reading out his arguments, so Hills, the President, asked another committee member to read them out for him. Although some other members of the committee agreed with Gandhi, the vote was lost and Allinson excluded. There were no hard feelings, with Hills proposing the toast at the LVS farewell dinner in honour of Gandhi's return to India.

Called to the bar 
Gandhi, at age 22, was called to the bar in June 1891 and then left London for India, where he learned that his mother had died while he was in London and that his family had kept the news from him. His attempts at establishing a law practice in Bombay failed because he was psychologically unable to cross-examine witnesses. He returned to Rajkot to make a modest living drafting petitions for litigants, but he was forced to stop when he ran afoul of a British officer Sam Sunny.

In 1893, a Muslim merchant in Kathiawar named Dada Abdullah contacted Gandhi. Abdullah owned a large successful shipping business in South Africa. His distant cousin in Johannesburg needed a lawyer, and they preferred someone with Kathiawari heritage. Gandhi inquired about his pay for the work. They offered a total salary of £105 (~$17,200 in 2019 money) plus travel expenses. He accepted it, knowing that it would be at least a one-year commitment in the Colony of Natal, South Africa, also a part of the British Empire.

Civil rights activist in South Africa (1893–1914) 

In April 1893, Gandhi aged 23, set sail for South Africa to be the lawyer for Abdullah's cousin. He spent 21 years in South Africa, where he developed his political views, ethics and politics.

Immediately upon arriving in South Africa, Gandhi faced discrimination because of his skin colour and heritage, like all people of colour. He was not allowed to sit with European passengers in the stagecoach and told to sit on the floor near the driver, then beaten when he refused; elsewhere he was kicked into a gutter for daring to walk near a house, in another instance thrown off a train at Pietermaritzburg after refusing to leave the first-class. He sat in the train station, shivering all night and pondering if he should return to India or protest for his rights. He chose to protest and was allowed to board the train the next day. In another incident, the magistrate of a Durban court ordered Gandhi to remove his turban, which he refused to do. Indians were not allowed to walk on public footpaths in South Africa. Gandhi was kicked by a police officer out of the footpath onto the street without warning.

When Gandhi arrived in South Africa, according to Herman, he thought of himself as "a Briton first, and an Indian second". However, the prejudice against him and his fellow Indians from British people that Gandhi experienced and observed deeply bothered him. He found it humiliating, struggling to understand how some people can feel honour or superiority or pleasure in such inhumane practices. Gandhi began to question his people's standing in the British Empire.

The Abdullah case that had brought him to South Africa concluded in May 1894, and the Indian community organised a farewell party for Gandhi as he prepared to return to India. However, a new Natal government discriminatory proposal led to Gandhi extending his original period of stay in South Africa. He planned to assist Indians in opposing a bill to deny them the right to vote, a right then proposed to be an exclusive European right. He asked Joseph Chamberlain, the British Colonial Secretary, to reconsider his position on this bill. Though unable to halt the bill's passage, his campaign was successful in drawing attention to the grievances of Indians in South Africa. He helped found the Natal Indian Congress in 1894, and through this organisation, he moulded the Indian community of South Africa into a unified political force. In January 1897, when Gandhi landed in Durban, a mob of white settlers attacked him and he escaped only through the efforts of the wife of the police superintendent. However, he refused to press charges against any member of the mob.

During the Boer War, Gandhi volunteered in 1900 to form a group of stretcher-bearers as the Natal Indian Ambulance Corps. According to Arthur Herman, Gandhi wanted to disprove the British colonial stereotype that Hindus were not fit for "manly" activities involving danger and exertion, unlike the Muslim "martial races". Gandhi raised eleven hundred Indian volunteers, to support British combat troops against the Boers. They were trained and medically certified to serve on the front lines. They were auxiliaries at the Battle of Colenso to a White volunteer ambulance corps. At the battle of Spion Kop Gandhi and his bearers moved to the front line and had to carry wounded soldiers for miles to a field hospital because the terrain was too rough for the ambulances. Gandhi and thirty-seven other Indians received the Queen's South Africa Medal.

In 1906, the Transvaal government promulgated a new Act compelling registration of the colony's Indian and Chinese populations. At a mass protest meeting held in Johannesburg on 11 September that year, Gandhi adopted his still evolving methodology of Satyagraha (devotion to the truth), or nonviolent protest, for the first time. According to Anthony Parel, Gandhi was also influenced by the Tamil moral text Tirukkuṛaḷ after Leo Tolstoy mentioned it in their correspondence that began with "A Letter to a Hindu". Gandhi urged Indians to defy the new law and to suffer the punishments for doing so. Gandhi's ideas of protests, persuasion skills and public relations had emerged. He took these back to India in 1915.

Europeans, Indians and Africans 
Gandhi focused his attention on Indians and Africans while he was in South Africa. He initially was not interested in politics. This changed, however, after he was discriminated against and bullied, such as by being thrown out of a train coach because of his skin colour by a white train official. After several such incidents with Whites in South Africa, Gandhi's thinking and focus changed, and he felt he must resist this and fight for rights. He entered politics by forming the Natal Indian Congress. According to Ashwin Desai and Goolam Vahed, Gandhi's views on racism are contentious in some cases, but that changed afterward. Gandhi suffered persecution from the beginning in South Africa. Like with other coloured people, white officials denied him his rights, and the press and those in the streets bullied and called him a "parasite", "semi-barbarous", "canker", "squalid coolie", "yellow man", and other epithets. People would spit on him as an expression of racial hate.

While in South Africa, Gandhi focused on the racial persecution of Indians before he started to focus on racism against Africans. In some cases, state Desai and Vahed, his behaviour was one of being a willing part of racial stereotyping and African exploitation. During a speech in September 1896, Gandhi complained that the whites in the British colony of South Africa were "degrading the Indian to the level of a raw Kaffir". Scholars cite it as an example of evidence that Gandhi at that time thought of Indians and black South Africans differently. As another example given by Herman, Gandhi, at age 24, prepared a legal brief for the Natal Assembly in 1895, seeking voting rights for Indians. Gandhi cited race history and European Orientalists' opinions that "Anglo-Saxons and Indians are sprung from the same Aryan stock or rather the Indo-European peoples", and argued that Indians should not be grouped with the Africans.

Years later, Gandhi and his colleagues served and helped Africans as nurses and by opposing racism. The Nobel Peace Prize winner Nelson Mandela is among admirers of Gandhi's efforts to fight against racism in Africa. The general image of Gandhi, state Desai and Vahed, has been reinvented since his assassination as if he was always a saint when in reality his life was more complex, contained inconvenient truths and was one that changed over time. Scholars have also pointed the evidence to a rich history of co-operation and efforts by Gandhi and Indian people with nonwhite South Africans against persecution of Africans and the Apartheid.

In 1906, when the Bambatha Rebellion broke out in the colony of Natal, then 36-year-old Gandhi, despite sympathising with the Zulu rebels encouraged Indian South Africans to form a volunteer stretcher-bearer unit. Writing in the Indian Opinion, Gandhi argued that military service would be beneficial to the Indian community and claimed it would give them "health and happiness." Gandhi eventually led a volunteer mixed unit of Indian and African stretcher-bearers to treat wounded combatants during the suppression of the rebellion.

The medical unit commanded by Gandhi operated for less than two months before being disbanded. After the suppression of the rebellion, the colonial establishment showed no interest in extending to the Indian community the civil rights granted to white South Africans. This led Gandhi to becoming disillusioned with the Empire and aroused a spiritual awakening with him; historian Arthur L. Herman wrote that his African experience was a part of his great disillusionment with the West, transforming him into an "uncompromising non-cooperator".

By 1910, Gandhi's newspaper, Indian Opinion, was covering reports on discrimination against Africans by the colonial regime. Gandhi remarked that the Africans are "alone are the original inhabitants of the land. … The whites, on the other hand, have occupied the land forcibly and appropriated it to themselves."

In 1910, Gandhi established, with the help of his friend Hermann Kallenbach, an idealistic community they named Tolstoy Farm near Johannesburg. There he nurtured his policy of peaceful resistance.

In the years after black South Africans gained the right to vote in South Africa (1994), Gandhi was proclaimed a national hero with numerous monuments.

Struggle for Indian independence (1915–1947) 

At the request of Gopal Krishna Gokhale, conveyed to him by C. F. Andrews, Gandhi returned to India in 1915. He brought an international reputation as a leading Indian nationalist, theorist and community organiser.

Gandhi joined the Indian National Congress and was introduced to Indian issues, politics and the Indian people primarily by Gokhale. Gokhale was a key leader of the Congress Party best known for his restraint and moderation, and his insistence on working inside the system. Gandhi took Gokhale's liberal approach based on British Whiggish traditions and transformed it to make it look Indian.

Gandhi took leadership of the Congress in 1920 and began escalating demands until on 26 January 1930 the Indian National Congress declared the independence of India. The British did not recognise the declaration but negotiations ensued, with the Congress taking a role in provincial government in the late 1930s. Gandhi and the Congress withdrew their support of the Raj when the Viceroy declared war on Germany in September 1939 without consultation. Tensions escalated until Gandhi demanded immediate independence in 1942 and the British responded by imprisoning him and tens of thousands of Congress leaders. Meanwhile, the Muslim League did co-operate with Britain and moved, against Gandhi's strong opposition, to demands for a totally separate Muslim state of Pakistan. In August 1947 the British partitioned the land with India and Pakistan each achieving independence on terms that Gandhi disapproved.

Role in World War I 

In April 1918, during the latter part of World War I, the Viceroy invited Gandhi to a War Conference in Delhi. Gandhi agreed to actively recruit Indians for the war effort. In contrast to the Zulu War of 1906 and the outbreak of World War I in 1914, when he recruited volunteers for the Ambulance Corps, this time Gandhi attempted to recruit combatants. In a June 1918 leaflet entitled "Appeal for Enlistment", Gandhi wrote "To bring about such a state of things we should have the ability to defend ourselves, that is, the ability to bear arms and to use them... If we want to learn the use of arms with the greatest possible despatch, it is our duty to enlist ourselves in the army." He did, however, stipulate in a letter to the Viceroy's private secretary that he "personally will not kill or injure anybody, friend or foe."

Gandhi's war recruitment campaign brought into question his consistency on nonviolence. Gandhi's private secretary noted that "The question of the consistency between his creed of 'Ahimsa' (nonviolence) and his recruiting campaign was raised not only then but has been discussed ever since."

Champaran agitations 

Gandhi's first major achievement came in 1917 with the Champaran agitation in Bihar. The Champaran agitation pitted the local peasantry against largely Anglo-Indian plantation owners who were backed by the local administration. The peasants were forced to grow indigo (Indigofera sp.), a cash crop for Indigo dye whose demand had been declining over two decades, and were forced to sell their crops to the planters at a fixed price. Unhappy with this, the peasantry appealed to Gandhi at his ashram in Ahmedabad. Pursuing a strategy of nonviolent protest, Gandhi took the administration by surprise and won concessions from the authorities.

Kheda agitations 

In 1918, Kheda was hit by floods and famine and the peasantry was demanding relief from taxes. Gandhi moved his headquarters to Nadiad, organising scores of supporters and fresh volunteers from the region, the most notable being Vallabhbhai Patel. Using non-co-operation as a technique, Gandhi initiated a signature campaign where peasants pledged non-payment of revenue even under the threat of confiscation of land. A social boycott of mamlatdars and talatdars (revenue officials within the district) accompanied the agitation. Gandhi worked hard to win public support for the agitation across the country. For five months, the administration refused, but by the end of May 1918, the Government gave way on important provisions and relaxed the conditions of payment of revenue tax until the famine ended. In Kheda, Vallabhbhai Patel represented the farmers in negotiations with the British, who suspended revenue collection and released all the prisoners.

Khilafat movement 

In 1919, following World War I, Gandhi (aged 49) sought political co-operation from Muslims in his fight against British imperialism by supporting the Ottoman Empire that had been defeated in the World War. Before this initiative of Gandhi, communal disputes and religious riots between Hindus and Muslims were common in British India, such as the riots of 1917–18. Gandhi had already supported the British crown with resources and by recruiting Indian soldiers to fight the war in Europe on the British side. This effort of Gandhi was in part motivated by the British promise to reciprocate the help with swaraj (self-government) to Indians after the end of World War I. The British government, instead of self government, had offered minor reforms instead, disappointing Gandhi. Gandhi announced his satyagraha (civil disobedience) intentions. The British colonial officials made their counter move by passing the Rowlatt Act, to block Gandhi's movement. The Act allowed the British government to treat civil disobedience participants as criminals and gave it the legal basis to arrest anyone for "preventive indefinite detention, incarceration without judicial review or any need for a trial".

Gandhi felt that Hindu-Muslim co-operation was necessary for political progress against the British. He leveraged the Khilafat movement, wherein Sunni Muslims in India, their leaders such as the sultans of princely states in India and Ali brothers championed the Turkish Caliph as a solidarity symbol of Sunni Islamic community (ummah). They saw the Caliph as their means to support Islam and the Islamic law after the defeat of Ottoman Empire in World War I. Gandhi's support to the Khilafat movement led to mixed results. It initially led to a strong Muslim support for Gandhi. However, the Hindu leaders including Rabindranath Tagore questioned Gandhi's leadership because they were largely against recognising or supporting the Sunni Islamic Caliph in Turkey.

The increasing Muslim support for Gandhi, after he championed the Caliph's cause, temporarily stopped the Hindu-Muslim communal violence. It offered evidence of inter-communal harmony in joint Rowlatt satyagraha demonstration rallies, raising Gandhi's stature as the political leader to the British. His support for the Khilafat movement also helped him sideline Muhammad Ali Jinnah, who had announced his opposition to the satyagraha non-co-operation movement approach of Gandhi. Jinnah began creating his independent support, and later went on to lead the demand for West and East Pakistan. Though they agreed in general terms on Indian independence, they disagreed on the means of achieving this. Jinnah was mainly interested in dealing with the British via constitutional negotiation, rather than attempting to agitate the masses.

By the end of 1922 the Khilafat movement had collapsed. Turkey's Atatürk had ended the Caliphate, Khilafat movement ended, and Muslim support for Gandhi largely evaporated. Muslim leaders and delegates abandoned Gandhi and his Congress. Hindu-Muslim communal conflicts reignited. Deadly religious riots re-appeared in numerous cities, with 91 in United Provinces of Agra and Oudh alone.

Non-co-operation 

With his book Hind Swaraj (1909) Gandhi, aged 40, declared that British rule was established in India with the co-operation of Indians and had survived only because of this co-operation. If Indians refused to co-operate, British rule would collapse and swaraj (Indian independence) would come.

In February 1919, Gandhi cautioned the Viceroy of India with a cable communication that if the British were to pass the Rowlatt Act, he would appeal to Indians to start civil disobedience. The British government ignored him and passed the law, stating it would not yield to threats. The satyagraha civil disobedience followed, with people assembling to protest the Rowlatt Act. On 30 March 1919, British law officers opened fire on an assembly of unarmed people, peacefully gathered, participating in satyagraha in Delhi.

People rioted in retaliation. On 6 April 1919, a Hindu festival day, he asked a crowd to remember not to injure or kill British people, but to express their frustration with peace, to boycott British goods and burn any British clothing they owned. He emphasised the use of non-violence to the British and towards each other, even if the other side used violence. Communities across India announced plans to gather in greater numbers to protest. Government warned him to not enter Delhi. Gandhi defied the order. On 9 April, Gandhi was arrested.

People rioted. On 13 April 1919, people including women with children gathered in an Amritsar park, and British Indian Army officer Reginald Dyer surrounded them and ordered troops under his command to fire on them. The resulting Jallianwala Bagh massacre (or Amritsar massacre) of hundreds of Sikh and Hindu civilians enraged the subcontinent, but was supported by some Britons and parts of the British media as a necessary response. Gandhi in Ahmedabad, on the day after the massacre in Amritsar, did not criticise the British and instead criticised his fellow countrymen for not exclusively using 'love' to deal with the 'hate' of the British government. Gandhi demanded that the Indian people stop all violence, stop all property destruction, and went on fast-to-death to pressure Indians to stop their rioting.

The massacre and Gandhi's non-violent response to it moved many, but also made some Sikhs and Hindus upset that Dyer was getting away with murder. Investigation committees were formed by the British, which Gandhi asked Indians to boycott. The unfolding events, the massacre and the British response, led Gandhi to the belief that Indians would never get fair and equal treatment under British rulers, and he shifted his attention to swaraj and political independence for India. In 1921, Gandhi was the leader of the Indian National Congress. He reorganised the Congress. With Congress now behind him, and Muslim support triggered by his backing the Khilafat movement to restore the Caliph in Turkey, Gandhi had the political support and the attention of the British Raj.

Gandhi expanded his nonviolent non-co-operation platform to include the swadeshi policy – the boycott of foreign-made goods, especially British goods. Linked to this was his advocacy that khadi (homespun cloth) be worn by all Indians instead of British-made textiles. Gandhi exhorted Indian men and women, rich or poor, to spend time each day spinning khadi in support of the independence movement. In addition to boycotting British products, Gandhi urged the people to boycott British institutions and law courts, to resign from government employment, and to forsake British titles and honours. Gandhi thus began his journey aimed at crippling the British India government economically, politically and administratively.

The appeal of "Non-cooperation" grew, its social popularity drew participation from all strata of Indian society. Gandhi was arrested on 10 March 1922, tried for sedition, and sentenced to six years' imprisonment. He began his sentence on 18 March 1922. With Gandhi isolated in prison, the Indian National Congress split into two factions, one led by Chitta Ranjan Das and Motilal Nehru favouring party participation in the legislatures, and the other led by Chakravarti Rajagopalachari and Sardar Vallabhbhai Patel, opposing this move. Furthermore, co-operation among Hindus and Muslims ended as Khilafat movement collapsed with the rise of Atatürk in Turkey. Muslim leaders left the Congress and began forming Muslim organisations. The political base behind Gandhi had broken into factions. Gandhi was released in February 1924 for an appendicitis operation, having served only two years.

Salt Satyagraha (Salt March) 

After his early release from prison for political crimes in 1924, over the second half of the 1920s Gandhi continued to pursue swaraj. He pushed through a resolution at the Calcutta Congress in December 1928 calling on the British government to grant India dominion status or face a new campaign of non-cooperation with complete independence for the country as its goal. After his support for World War I with Indian combat troops, and the failure of Khilafat movement in preserving the rule of Caliph in Turkey, followed by a collapse in Muslim support for his leadership, some such as Subhas Chandra Bose and Bhagat Singh questioned his values and non-violent approach. While many Hindu leaders championed a demand for immediate independence, Gandhi revised his own call to a one-year wait, instead of two.

The British did not respond favourably to Gandhi's proposal. British political leaders such as Lord Birkenhead and Winston Churchill announced opposition to "the appeasers of Gandhi" in their discussions with European diplomats who sympathised with Indian demands. On 31 December 1929, an Indian flag was unfurled in Lahore. Gandhi led Congress in a celebration on 26 January 1930 of India's Independence Day in Lahore. This day was commemorated by almost every other Indian organisation. Gandhi then launched a new Satyagraha against the British salt tax in March 1930. Gandhi sent an ultimatum in the form of a letter personally addressed to Lord Irwin, the viceroy of India, on 2 March. Gandhi condemned British rule in the letter, describing it as "a curse" that "has impoverished the dumb millions by a system of progressive exploitation and by a ruinously expensive military and civil administration...It has reduced us politically to serfdom." Gandhi also mentioned in the letter that the viceroy received a salary "over five thousand times India's average income." In the letter, Gandhi also stressed his continued adherence to non-violent forms of protest.

This was highlighted by the Salt March to Dandi from 12 March to 6 April, where, together with 78 volunteers, he marched  from Ahmedabad to Dandi, Gujarat to make salt himself, with the declared intention of breaking the salt laws. The march took 25 days to cover 240 miles with Gandhi speaking to often huge crowds along the way. Thousands of Indians joined him in Dandi. On 5 May he was interned under a regulation dating from 1827 in anticipation of a protest that he had planned. The protest at Dharasana salt works on 21 May went ahead without him see. A horrified American journalist, Webb Miller, described the British response thus:

This went on for hours until some 300 or more protesters had been beaten, many seriously injured and two killed. At no time did they offer any resistance.

This campaign was one of his most successful at upsetting British hold on India; Britain responded by imprisoning over 60,000 people. Congress estimates, however, put the figure at 90,000. Among them was one of Gandhi's lieutenants, Jawaharlal Nehru.

According to Sarma, Gandhi recruited women to participate in the salt tax campaigns and the boycott of foreign products, which gave many women a new self-confidence and dignity in the mainstream of Indian public life. However, other scholars such as Marilyn French state that Gandhi barred women from joining his civil disobedience movement because he feared he would be accused of using women as a political shield. When women insisted on joining the movement and participating in public demonstrations, Gandhi asked the volunteers to get permissions of their guardians and only those women who can arrange child-care should join him. Regardless of Gandhi's apprehensions and views, Indian women joined the Salt March by the thousands to defy the British salt taxes and monopoly on salt mining. After Gandhi's arrest, the women marched and picketed shops on their own, accepting violence and verbal abuse from British authorities for the cause in the manner Gandhi inspired.

Gandhi as folk hero 

Indian Congress in the 1920s appealed to Andhra Pradesh peasants by creating Telugu language plays that combined Indian mythology and legends, linked them to Gandhi's ideas, and portrayed Gandhi as a messiah, a reincarnation of ancient and medieval Indian nationalist leaders and saints. The plays built support among peasants steeped in traditional Hindu culture, according to Murali, and this effort made Gandhi a folk hero in Telugu speaking villages, a sacred messiah-like figure.

According to Dennis Dalton, it was Gandhi's ideas that were responsible for his wide following. Gandhi criticised Western civilisation as one driven by "brute force and immorality", contrasting it with his categorisation of Indian civilisation as one driven by "soul force and morality". Gandhi captured the imagination of the people of his heritage with his ideas about winning "hate with love". These ideas are evidenced in his pamphlets from the 1890s, in South Africa, where too he was popular among the Indian indentured workers. After he returned to India, people flocked to him because he reflected their values.

Gandhi also campaigned hard going from one rural corner of the Indian subcontinent to another. He used terminology and phrases such as Rama-rajya from Ramayana, Prahlada as a paradigmatic icon, and such cultural symbols as another facet of swaraj and satyagraha. During his lifetime, these ideas sounded strange outside India, but they readily and deeply resonated with the culture and historic values of his people.

Negotiations 
The government, represented by Lord Irwin, decided to negotiate with Gandhi. The Gandhi–Irwin Pact was signed in March 1931. The British Government agreed to free all political prisoners, in return for the suspension of the civil disobedience movement. According to the pact, Gandhi was invited to attend the Round Table Conference in London for discussions and as the sole representative of the Indian National Congress. The conference was a disappointment to Gandhi and the nationalists. Gandhi expected to discuss India's independence, while the British side focused on the Indian princes and Indian minorities rather than on a transfer of power. Lord Irwin's successor, Lord Willingdon, took a hard line against India as an independent nation, began a new campaign of controlling and subduing the nationalist movement. Gandhi was again arrested, and the government tried and failed to negate his influence by completely isolating him from his followers.

In Britain, Winston Churchill, a prominent Conservative politician who was then out of office but later became its prime minister, became a vigorous and articulate critic of Gandhi and opponent of his long-term plans. Churchill often ridiculed Gandhi, saying in a widely reported 1931 speech:

Churchill's bitterness against Gandhi grew in the 1930s. He called Gandhi as the one who was "seditious in aim" whose evil genius and multiform menace was attacking the British empire. Churchill called him a dictator, a "Hindu Mussolini", fomenting a race war, trying to replace the Raj with Brahmin cronies, playing on the ignorance of Indian masses, all for selfish gain. Churchill attempted to isolate Gandhi, and his criticism of Gandhi was widely covered by European and American press. It gained Churchill sympathetic support, but it also increased support for Gandhi among Europeans. The developments heightened Churchill's anxiety that the "British themselves would give up out of pacifism and misplaced conscience".

Round Table Conferences 

During the discussions between Gandhi and the British government over 1931–32 at the Round Table Conferences, Gandhi, now aged about 62, sought constitutional reforms as a preparation to the end of colonial British rule, and begin the self-rule by Indians. The British side sought reforms that would keep the Indian subcontinent as a colony. The British negotiators proposed constitutional reforms on a British Dominion model that established separate electorates based on religious and social divisions. The British questioned the Congress party and Gandhi's authority to speak for all of India. They invited Indian religious leaders, such as Muslims and Sikhs, to press their demands along religious lines, as well as B. R. Ambedkar as the representative leader of the untouchables. Gandhi vehemently opposed a constitution that enshrined rights or representations based on communal divisions, because he feared that it would not bring people together but divide them, perpetuate their status, and divert the attention from India's struggle to end the colonial rule.

The Second Round Table conference was the only time he left India between 1914 and his death in 1948. He declined the government's offer of accommodation in an expensive West End hotel, preferring to stay in the East End, to live among working-class people, as he did in India. He based himself in a small cell-bedroom at Kingsley Hall for the three-month duration of his stay and was enthusiastically received by East Enders. During this time he renewed his links with the British vegetarian movement.

After Gandhi returned from the Second Round Table conference, he started a new satyagraha. He was arrested and imprisoned at the Yerwada Jail, Pune. While he was in prison, the British government enacted a new law that granted untouchables a separate electorate. It came to be known as the Communal Award. In protest, Gandhi started a fast-unto-death, while he was held in prison. The resulting public outcry forced the government, in consultations with Ambedkar, to replace the Communal Award with a compromise Poona Pact.

Congress politics 
In 1934 Gandhi resigned from Congress party membership. He did not disagree with the party's position but felt that if he resigned, his popularity with Indians would cease to stifle the party's membership, which actually varied, including communists, socialists, trade unionists, students, religious conservatives, and those with pro-business convictions, and that these various voices would get a chance to make themselves heard. Gandhi also wanted to avoid being a target for Raj propaganda by leading a party that had temporarily accepted political accommodation with the Raj.

Gandhi returned to active politics again in 1936, with the Nehru presidency and the Lucknow session of the Congress. Although Gandhi wanted a total focus on the task of winning independence and not speculation about India's future, he did not restrain the Congress from adopting socialism as its goal. Gandhi had a clash with Subhas Chandra Bose, who had been elected president in 1938, and who had previously expressed a lack of faith in nonviolence as a means of protest. Despite Gandhi's opposition, Bose won a second term as Congress President, against Gandhi's nominee, Dr. Pattabhi Sitaramayya; but left the Congress when the All-India leaders resigned en masse in protest of his abandonment of the principles introduced by Gandhi. Gandhi declared that Sitaramayya's defeat was his defeat.

World War II and Quit India movement 

Gandhi opposed providing any help to the British war effort and he campaigned against any Indian participation in World War II. The British government responded with the arrests of Gandhi and many other Congress leaders and killed over 1,000 Indians who participated in this movement. A number of violent attacks were also carried out by the nationalists against the British government. While Gandhi's campaign did not enjoy the support of a number of Indian leaders, and over 2.5 million Indians volunteered and joined the British military to fight on various fronts of the Allied Forces, the movement played a role in weakening the control over the South Asian region by the British regime and it ultimately paved the way for Indian independence.

Gandhi's opposition to the Indian participation in World War II was motivated by his belief that India could not be party to a war ostensibly being fought for democratic freedom while that freedom was denied to India itself. He also condemned Nazism and Fascism, a view which won endorsement of other Indian leaders. As the war progressed, Gandhi intensified his demand for independence, calling for the British to Quit India in a 1942 speech in Mumbai. This was Gandhi's and the Congress Party's most definitive revolt aimed at securing the British exit from India. The British government responded quickly to the Quit India speech, and within hours after Gandhi's speech arrested Gandhi and all the members of the Congress Working Committee. His countrymen retaliated the arrests by damaging or burning down hundreds of government owned railway stations, police stations, and cutting down telegraph wires.

In 1942, Gandhi now nearing age 73, urged his people to completely stop co-operating with the imperial government. In this effort, he urged that they neither kill nor injure British people, but be willing to suffer and die if violence is initiated by the British officials. He clarified that the movement would not be stopped because of any individual acts of violence, saying that the "ordered anarchy" of "the present system of administration" was "worse than real anarchy." He urged Indians to Karo ya maro ("Do or die") in the cause of their rights and freedoms.

Gandhi's arrest lasted two years, as he was held in the Aga Khan Palace in Pune. During this period, his long time secretary Mahadev Desai died of a heart attack, his wife Kasturba died after 18 months' imprisonment on 22 February 1944; and Gandhi suffered a severe malaria attack. While in jail, he agreed to an interview with Stuart Gelder, a British journalist. Gelder then composed and released an interview summary, cabled it to the mainstream press, that announced sudden concessions Gandhi was willing to make, comments that shocked his countrymen, the Congress workers and even Gandhi. The latter two claimed that it distorted what Gandhi actually said on a range of topics and falsely repudiated the Quit India movement.

Gandhi was released before the end of the war on 6 May 1944 because of his failing health and necessary surgery; the Raj did not want him to die in prison and enrage the nation. He came out of detention to an altered political scene – the Muslim League for example, which a few years earlier had appeared marginal, "now occupied the centre of the political stage" and the topic of Muhammad Ali Jinnah's campaign for Pakistan was a major talking point. Gandhi and Jinnah had extensive correspondence and the two men met several times over a period of two weeks in September 1944 at Jinnah's house in Bombay, where Gandhi insisted on a united religiously plural and independent India which included Muslims and non-Muslims of the Indian subcontinent coexisting. Jinnah rejected this proposal and insisted instead for partitioning the subcontinent on religious lines to create a separate Muslim India (later Pakistan). These discussions continued through 1947.

While the leaders of Congress languished in jail, the other parties supported the war and gained organisational strength. Underground publications flailed at the ruthless suppression of Congress, but it had little control over events. At the end of the war, the British gave clear indications that power would be transferred to Indian hands. At this point Gandhi called off the struggle, and around 100,000 political prisoners were released, including the Congress's leadership.

Partition and independence 

Gandhi opposed the partition of the Indian subcontinent along religious lines. The Indian National Congress and Gandhi called for the British to Quit India. However, the All-India Muslim League demanded "Divide and Quit India". Gandhi suggested an agreement which required the Congress and the Muslim League to co-operate and attain independence under a provisional government, thereafter, the question of partition could be resolved by a plebiscite in the districts with a Muslim majority.

Jinnah rejected Gandhi's proposal and called for Direct Action Day, on 16 August 1946, to press Muslims to publicly gather in cities and support his proposal for the partition of the Indian subcontinent into a Muslim state and non-Muslim state. Huseyn Shaheed Suhrawardy, the Muslim League Chief Minister of Bengal – now Bangladesh and West Bengal, gave Calcutta's police special holiday to celebrate the Direct Action Day. The Direct Action Day triggered a mass murder of Calcutta Hindus and the torching of their property, and holidaying police were missing to contain or stop the conflict. The British government did not order its army to move in to contain the violence. The violence on Direct Action Day led to retaliatory violence against Muslims across India. Thousands of Hindus and Muslims were murdered, and tens of thousands were injured in the cycle of violence in the days that followed. Gandhi visited the most riot-prone areas to appeal a stop to the massacres.

Archibald Wavell, the Viceroy and Governor-General of British India for three years through February 1947, had worked with Gandhi and Jinnah to find a common ground, before and after accepting Indian independence in principle. Wavell condemned Gandhi's character and motives as well as his ideas. Wavell accused Gandhi of harbouring the single minded idea to "overthrow British rule and influence and to establish a Hindu raj", and called Gandhi a "malignant, malevolent, exceedingly shrewd" politician. Wavell feared a civil war on the Indian subcontinent, and doubted Gandhi would be able to stop it.

The British reluctantly agreed to grant independence to the people of the Indian subcontinent, but accepted Jinnah's proposal of partitioning the land into Pakistan and India. Gandhi was involved in the final negotiations, but Stanley Wolpert states the "plan to carve up British India was never approved of or accepted by Gandhi".

The partition was controversial and violently disputed. More than half a million were killed in religious riots as 10 million to 12 million non-Muslims (Hindus and Sikhs mostly) migrated from Pakistan into India, and Muslims migrated from India into Pakistan, across the newly created borders of India, West Pakistan and East Pakistan.

Gandhi spent the day of independence not celebrating the end of the British rule but appealing for peace among his countrymen by fasting and spinning in Calcutta on 15 August 1947. The partition had gripped the Indian subcontinent with religious violence and the streets were filled with corpses. Some writers credit Gandhi's fasting and protests for stopping the religious riots and communal violence.

Death 

At 5:17 pm on 30 January 1948, Gandhi was with his grandnieces in the garden of Birla House (now Gandhi Smriti), on his way to address a prayer meeting, when Nathuram Godse, a Hindu nationalist, fired three bullets into his chest from a pistol at close range. According to some accounts, Gandhi died instantly. In other accounts, such as one prepared by an eyewitness journalist, Gandhi was carried into the Birla House, into a bedroom. There he died about 30 minutes later as one of Gandhi's family members read verses from Hindu scriptures.

Prime Minister Jawaharlal Nehru addressed his countrymen over the All-India Radio saying:

Friends and comrades, the light has gone out of our lives, and there is darkness everywhere, and I do not quite know what to tell you or how to say it. Our beloved leader, Bapu as we called him, the father of the nation, is no more. Perhaps I am wrong to say that; nevertheless, we will not see him again, as we have seen him for these many years, we will not run to him for advice or seek solace from him, and that is a terrible blow, not only for me, but for millions and millions in this country.

Godse, a Hindu nationalist with links to the  Hindu Mahasabha and the Rashtriya Swayamsevak Sangh, made no attempt to escape; several other conspirators were soon arrested as well. The accused were Nathuram Vinayak Godse (Pune, Maharashtra; a former member of Rashtriya Swayamsevak Sangh, editor, journalist), Narayan Apte (Pune, Maharashtra; formerly: British military service, teacher, newspaper manager), Vinayak Damodar Savarkar (Mumbai, Maharashtra; author, lawyer, former member of Rashtriya Swayamsevak Sangh, former president of Akhil Bharatiya Hindu Mahasabha), Shankar Kistayya (Pune, Maharashtra; rickshaw puller, domestic worker employed by Digambar Badge), Dattatraya Parchure (Gwalior, Madhya Pradesh; medical service, care giver), Vishnu Karkare (Ahmednagar, Maharashtra; orphan; odd jobs in hotels, musician in a traveling troupe, volunteer in relief efforts to religious riots (Noakhali), later restaurant owner), Madanlal Pahwa (Ahmednagar refugee camp, Maharashtra; former British Indian army soldier, unemployed, Punjabi refugee who had migrated to India from Pakistan during the Partition.), Gopal Godse (Pune, Maharashtra; brother of Nathuram Godse; storekeeper, merchant)

The trial began on 27May 1948 and ran for eight months before Justice Atma Charan passed his final order on 10February 1949. The prosecution called 149 witnesses, the defense none. The court found all of the defendants except one guilty as charged. Eight men were convicted for the murder conspiracy, and others convicted for violation of the Explosive Substances Act. Savarkar was acquitted and set free. Nathuram Godse and Narayan Apte were sentenced to death by hanging and the remaining six (including Godse's brother, Gopal) were sentenced to life imprisonment.

Gandhi's death was mourned nationwide. Over a million people joined the five-mile-long funeral procession that took over five hours to reach Raj Ghat from Birla house, where he was assassinated, and another million watched the procession pass by. Gandhi's body was transported on a weapons carrier, whose chassis was dismantled overnight to allow a high-floor to be installed so that people could catch a glimpse of his body. The engine of the vehicle was not used; instead four drag-ropes held by 50 people each pulled the vehicle. All Indian-owned establishments in London remained closed in mourning as thousands of people from all faiths and denominations and Indians from all over Britain converged at India House in London.

Gandhi's assassination dramatically changed the political landscape. Nehru became his political heir. According to Markovits, while Gandhi was alive, Pakistan's declaration that it was a "Muslim state" had led Indian groups to demand that it be declared a "Hindu state". Nehru used Gandhi's martyrdom as a political weapon to silence all advocates of Hindu nationalism as well as his political challengers. He linked Gandhi's assassination to politics of hatred and ill-will.

According to Guha, Nehru and his Congress colleagues called on Indians to honour Gandhi's memory and even more his ideals. Nehru used the assassination to consolidate the authority of the new Indian state. Gandhi's death helped marshal support for the new government and legitimise the Congress Party's control, leveraged by the massive outpouring of Hindu expressions of grief for a man who had inspired them for decades. The government suppressed the RSS, the Muslim National Guards, and the Khaksars, with some 200,000 arrests.

For years after the assassination, states Markovits, "Gandhi's shadow loomed large over the political life of the new Indian Republic". The government quelled any opposition to its economic and social policies, despite these being contrary to Gandhi's ideas, by reconstructing Gandhi's image and ideals.

Funeral and memorials 

Gandhi was cremated in accordance with Hindu tradition. Gandhi's ashes were poured into urns which were sent across India for memorial services. Most of the ashes were immersed at the Sangam at Allahabad on 12 February 1948, but some were secretly taken away. In 1997, Tushar Gandhi immersed the contents of one urn, found in a bank vault and reclaimed through the courts, at the Sangam at Allahabad. Some of Gandhi's ashes were scattered at the source of the Nile River near Jinja, Uganda, and a memorial plaque marks the event. On 30 January 2008, the contents of another urn were immersed at Girgaum Chowpatty. Another urn is at the palace of the Aga Khan in Pune (where Gandhi was held as a political prisoner from 1942 to 1944) and another in the Self-Realization Fellowship Lake Shrine in Los Angeles.

The Birla House site where Gandhi was assassinated is now a memorial called Gandhi Smriti. The place near Yamuna river where he was cremated is the Rāj Ghāt memorial in New Delhi. A black marble platform, it bears the epigraph "Hē Rāma" (Devanagari: हे ! राम or, Hey Raam). These are widely believed to be Gandhi's last words after he was shot, though the veracity of this statement has been questioned.

Principles, practices, and beliefs 

Gandhi's statements, letters and life have attracted much political and scholarly analysis of his principles, practices and beliefs, including what influenced him. Some writers present him as a paragon of ethical living and pacifism, while others present him as a more complex, contradictory and evolving character influenced by his culture and circumstances.

Influences 

Gandhi grew up in a Hindu and Jain religious atmosphere in his native Gujarat, which were his primary influences, but he was also influenced by his personal reflections and literature of Hindu Bhakti saints, Advaita Vedanta, Islam, Buddhism, Christianity, and thinkers such as Tolstoy, Ruskin and Thoreau. At age 57 he declared himself to be Advaitist Hindu in his religious persuasion, but added that he supported Dvaitist viewpoints and religious pluralism.

Gandhi was influenced by his devout Vaishnava Hindu mother, the regional Hindu temples and saint tradition which co-existed with Jain tradition in Gujarat. Historian R.B. Cribb states that Gandhi's thought evolved over time, with his early ideas becoming the core or scaffolding for his mature philosophy. He committed himself early to truthfulness, temperance, chastity, and vegetarianism.

Gandhi's London lifestyle incorporated the values he had grown up with. When he returned to India in 1891, his outlook was parochial and he could not make a living as a lawyer. This challenged his belief that practicality and morality necessarily coincided. By moving in 1893 to South Africa he found a solution to this problem and developed the central concepts of his mature philosophy.

According to Bhikhu Parekh, three books that influenced Gandhi most in South Africa were William Salter's Ethical Religion (1889); Henry David Thoreau's On the Duty of Civil Disobedience (1849); and Leo Tolstoy's The Kingdom of God Is Within You (1894). The art critic and critic of political economy John Ruskin inspired his decision to live an austere life on a commune, at first on the Phoenix Farm in Natal and then on the Tolstoy Farm just outside Johannesburg, South Africa. The most profound influence on Gandhi were those from Hinduism, Christianity and Jainism, states Parekh, with his thoughts "in harmony with the classical Indian traditions, specially the Advaita or monistic tradition".

According to Indira Carr and others, Gandhi was influenced by Vaishnavism, Jainism and Advaita Vedanta. Balkrishna Gokhale states that Gandhi was influenced by Hinduism and Jainism, and his studies of Sermon on the Mount of Christianity, Ruskin and Tolstoy.

Additional theories of possible influences on Gandhi have been proposed. For example, in 1935, N. A. Toothi stated that Gandhi was influenced by the reforms and teachings of the Swaminarayan tradition of Hinduism. According to Raymond Williams, Toothi may have overlooked the influence of the Jain community, and adds close parallels do exist in programs of social reform in the Swaminarayan tradition and those of Gandhi, based on "nonviolence, truth-telling, cleanliness, temperance and upliftment of the masses." Historian Howard states the culture of Gujarat influenced Gandhi and his methods.

Leo Tolstoy 

Along with the book mentioned above, in 1908 Leo Tolstoy wrote A Letter to a Hindu, which said that only by using love as a weapon through passive resistance could the Indian people overthrow colonial rule. In 1909, Gandhi wrote to Tolstoy seeking advice and permission to republish A Letter to a Hindu in Gujarati. Tolstoy responded and the two continued a correspondence until Tolstoy's death in 1910 (Tolstoy's last letter was to Gandhi). The letters concern practical and theological applications of nonviolence. Gandhi saw himself a disciple of Tolstoy, for they agreed regarding opposition to state authority and colonialism; both hated violence and preached non-resistance. However, they differed sharply on political strategy. Gandhi called for political involvement; he was a nationalist and was prepared to use nonviolent force. He was also willing to compromise. It was at Tolstoy Farm where Gandhi and Hermann Kallenbach systematically trained their disciples in the philosophy of nonviolence.

Shrimad Rajchandra 
Gandhi credited Shrimad Rajchandra, a poet and Jain philosopher, as his influential counsellor. In Modern Review, June 1930, Gandhi wrote about their first encounter in 1891 at Dr. P.J. Mehta's residence in Bombay. He was introduced to Shrimad by Dr. Pranjivan Mehta. Gandhi exchanged letters with Rajchandra when he was in South Africa, referring to him as Kavi (literally, "poet"). In 1930, Gandhi wrote, "Such was the man who captivated my heart in religious matters as no other man ever has till now." "I have said elsewhere that in moulding my inner life Tolstoy and Ruskin vied with Kavi. But Kavi's influence was undoubtedly deeper if only because I had come in closest personal touch with him."

Gandhi, in his autobiography, called Rajchandra his "guide and helper" and his "refuge [...] in moments of spiritual crisis". He had advised Gandhi to be patient and to study Hinduism deeply.

Religious texts 
During his stay in South Africa, along with scriptures and philosophical texts of Hinduism and other Indian religions, Gandhi read translated texts of Christianity such as the Bible, and Islam such as the Quran. A Quaker mission in South Africa attempted to convert him to Christianity. Gandhi joined them in their prayers and debated Christian theology with them, but refused conversion stating he did not accept the theology therein or that Christ was the only son of God.

His comparative studies of religions and interaction with scholars, led him to respect all religions as well as become concerned about imperfections in all of them and frequent misinterpretations. Gandhi grew fond of Hinduism, and referred to the Bhagavad Gita as his spiritual dictionary and greatest single influence on his life. Later, Gandhi translated the Gita into Gujarati in 1930.

Sufism 
Gandhi was acquainted with Sufi Islam's Chishti Order during his stay in South Africa. He attended Khanqah gatherings there at Riverside. According to Margaret Chatterjee, Gandhi as a Vaishnava Hindu shared values such as humility, devotion and brotherhood for the poor that is also found in Sufism. Winston Churchill also compared Gandhi to a Sufi fakir.

On wars and nonviolence

Wars 
Gandhi participated in forming the Indian Ambulance Corps in the South African war against the Boers, on the British side in 1899. Both the Dutch settlers called Boers and the imperial British at that time discriminated against the coloured races they considered as inferior, and Gandhi later wrote about his conflicted beliefs during the Boer war. He stated that "when the war was declared, my personal sympathies were all with the Boers, but my loyalty to the British rule drove me to participation with the British in that war. I felt that, if I demanded rights as a British citizen, it was also my duty, as such to participate in the defence of the British Empire, so I collected together as many comrades as possible, and with very great difficulty got their services accepted as an ambulance corps."

During World War I (1914–1918), nearing the age of 50, Gandhi supported the British and its allied forces by recruiting Indians to join the British army, expanding the Indian contingent from about 100,000 to over 1.1 million. He encouraged Indian people to fight on one side of the war in Europe and Africa at the cost of their lives. Pacifists criticised and questioned Gandhi, who defended these practices by stating, according to Sankar Ghose, "it would be madness for me to sever my connection with the society to which I belong". According to Keith Robbins, the recruitment effort was in part motivated by the British promise to reciprocate the help with swaraj (self-government) to Indians after the end of World War I. After the war, the British government offered minor reforms instead, which disappointed Gandhi. He launched his satyagraha movement in 1919. In parallel, Gandhi's fellowmen became sceptical of his pacifist ideas and were inspired by the ideas of nationalism and anti-imperialism.

In a 1920 essay, after the World War I, Gandhi wrote, "where there is only a choice between cowardice and violence, I would advise violence." Rahul Sagar interprets Gandhi's efforts to recruit for the British military during the War, as Gandhi's belief that, at that time, it would demonstrate that Indians were willing to fight. Further, it would also show the British that his fellow Indians were "their subjects by choice rather than out of cowardice." In 1922, Gandhi wrote that abstinence from violence is effective and true forgiveness only when one has the power to punish, not when one decides not to do anything because one is helpless.

After World War II engulfed Britain, Gandhi actively campaigned to oppose any help to the British war effort and any Indian participation in the war by launching Quit India Movement. According to Arthur Herman, Gandhi believed that his campaign would strike a blow to imperialism. The British government responded with mass arrests including that of Gandhi and Congress leaders and killed over 1,000 Indians who participated in this movement. A number of violent attacks were also carried out by the nationalists against the British government. While 2.5 million Indians volunteered and joined on the British side and fought as a part of the Allied forces in Europe, North Africa and various fronts of the World War II, the Quit India Movement played a role in weakening the control over the South Asian region by the British regime and ultimately paved the way for Indian independence.

Truth and Satyagraha 

Gandhi dedicated his life to discovering and pursuing truth, or Satya, and called his movement satyagraha, which means "appeal to, insistence on, or reliance on the Truth". The first formulation of the satyagraha as a political movement and principle occurred in 1920, which he tabled as "Resolution on Non-cooperation" in September that year before a session of the Indian Congress. It was the satyagraha formulation and step, states Dennis Dalton, that deeply resonated with beliefs and culture of his people, embedded him into the popular consciousness, transforming him quickly into Mahatma.

Gandhi based Satyagraha on the Vedantic ideal of self-realisation, ahimsa (nonviolence), vegetarianism, and universal love. William Borman states that the key to his satyagraha is rooted in the Hindu Upanishadic texts. According to Indira Carr, Gandhi's ideas on ahimsa and satyagraha were founded on the philosophical foundations of Advaita Vedanta. I. Bruce Watson states that some of these ideas are found not only in traditions within Hinduism, but also in Jainism or Buddhism, particularly those about non-violence, vegetarianism and universal love, but Gandhi's synthesis was to politicise these ideas. Gandhi's concept of satya as a civil movement, states Glyn Richards, are best understood in the context of the Hindu terminology of Dharma and Ṛta.

Gandhi stated that the most important battle to fight was overcoming his own demons, fears, and insecurities. Gandhi summarised his beliefs first when he said "God is Truth". He would later change this statement to "Truth is God". Thus, satya (truth) in Gandhi's philosophy is "God". Gandhi, states Richards, described the term "God" not as a separate power, but as the Being (Brahman, Atman) of the Advaita Vedanta tradition, a nondual universal that pervades in all things, in each person and all life. According to Nicholas Gier, this to Gandhi meant the unity of God and humans, that all beings have the same one soul and therefore equality, that atman exists and is same as everything in the universe, ahimsa (non-violence) is the very nature of this atman.

The essence of Satyagraha is "soul force" as a political means, refusing to use brute force against the oppressor, seeking to eliminate antagonisms between the oppressor and the oppressed, aiming to transform or "purify" the oppressor. It is not inaction but determined passive resistance and non-co-operation where, states Arthur Herman, "love conquers hate". A euphemism sometimes used for Satyagraha is that it is a "silent force" or a "soul force" (a term also used by Martin Luther King Jr. during his "I Have a Dream" speech). It arms the individual with moral power rather than physical power. Satyagraha is also termed a "universal force", as it essentially "makes no distinction between kinsmen and strangers, young and old, man and woman, friend and foe."

Gandhi wrote: "There must be no impatience, no barbarity, no insolence, no undue pressure. If we want to cultivate a true spirit of democracy, we cannot afford to be intolerant. Intolerance betrays want of faith in one's cause." Civil disobedience and non-co-operation as practised under Satyagraha are based on the "law of suffering", a doctrine that the endurance of suffering is a means to an end. This end usually implies a moral upliftment or progress of an individual or society. Therefore, non-co-operation in Satyagraha is in fact a means to secure the co-operation of the opponent consistently with truth and justice.

While Gandhi's idea of satyagraha as a political means attracted a widespread following among Indians, the support was not universal. For example, Muslim leaders such as Jinnah opposed the satyagraha idea, accused Gandhi to be reviving Hinduism through political activism, and began effort to counter Gandhi with Muslim nationalism and a demand for Muslim homeland. The untouchability leader Ambedkar, in June 1945, after his decision to convert to Buddhism and the first Law and Justice minister of modern India, dismissed Gandhi's ideas as loved by "blind Hindu devotees", primitive, influenced by spurious brew of Tolstoy and Ruskin, and "there is always some simpleton to preach them". Winston Churchill caricatured Gandhi as a "cunning huckster" seeking selfish gain, an "aspiring dictator", and an "atavistic spokesman of a pagan Hinduism". Churchill stated that the civil disobedience movement spectacle of Gandhi only increased "the danger to which white people there [British India] are exposed".

Nonviolence 

Although Gandhi was not the originator of the principle of nonviolence, he was the first to apply it in the political field on a large scale. The concept of nonviolence (ahimsa) has a long history in Indian religious thought, and is considered the highest dharma (ethical value virtue), a precept to be observed towards all living beings (sarvbhuta), at all times (sarvada), in all respects (sarvatha), in action, words and thought. Gandhi explains his philosophy and ideas about ahimsa as a political means in his autobiography The Story of My Experiments with Truth.

Gandhi's views came under heavy criticism in Britain when it was under attack from Nazi Germany, and later when the Holocaust was revealed. He told the British people in 1940, "I would like you to lay down the arms you have as being useless for saving you or humanity. You will invite Herr Hitler and Signor Mussolini to take what they want of the countries you call your possessions... If these gentlemen choose to occupy your homes, you will vacate them. If they do not give you free passage out, you will allow yourselves, man, woman, and child, to be slaughtered, but you will refuse to owe allegiance to them." George Orwell remarked that Gandhi's methods confronted "an old-fashioned and rather shaky despotism which treated him in a fairly chivalrous way", not a totalitarian power, "where political opponents simply disappear."

In a post-war interview in 1946, he said, "Hitler killed five million Jews. It is the greatest crime of our time. But the Jews should have offered themselves to the butcher's knife. They should have thrown themselves into the sea from cliffs... It would have aroused the world and the people of Germany... As it is they succumbed anyway in their millions." Gandhi believed this act of "collective suicide", in response to the Holocaust, "would have been heroism".

Gandhi as a politician, in practice, settled for less than complete non-violence. His method of non-violent Satyagraha could easily attract masses and it fitted in with the interests and sentiments of business groups, better-off people and dominant sections of peasantry, who did not want an uncontrolled and violent social revolution which could create losses for them. His doctrine of ahimsa lay at the core of unifying role played by the Gandhian Congress. However, during the Quit India Movement, even many staunch Gandhians used 'violent means'.

On inter-religious relations

Buddhists, Jains and Sikhs 
Gandhi believed that Buddhism, Jainism and Sikhism were traditions of Hinduism, with a shared history, rites and ideas. At other times, he acknowledged that he knew little about Buddhism other than his reading of Edwin Arnold's book on it. Based on that book, he considered Buddhism to be a reform movement and the Buddha to be a Hindu. He stated he knew Jainism much more, and he credited Jains to have profoundly influenced him. Sikhism, to Gandhi, was an integral part of Hinduism, in the form of another reform movement. Sikh and Buddhist leaders disagreed with Gandhi, a disagreement Gandhi respected as a difference of opinion.

Muslims 
Gandhi had generally positive and empathetic views of Islam, and he extensively studied the Quran. He viewed Islam as a faith that proactively promoted peace, and felt that non-violence had a predominant place in the Quran. He also read the Islamic prophet Muhammad's biography, and argued that it was "not the sword that won a place for Islam in those days in the scheme of life. It was the rigid simplicity, the utter self-effacement of the Prophet, the scrupulous regard for pledges, his intense devotion to his friends and followers, his intrepidity, his fearlessness, his absolute trust in God and in his own mission." Gandhi had a large Indian Muslim following, who he encouraged to join him in a mutual nonviolent jihad against the social oppression of their time. Prominent Muslim allies in his nonviolent resistance movement included Maulana Abul Kalam Azad and Abdul Ghaffar Khan. However, Gandhi's empathy towards Islam, and his eager willingness to valorise peaceful Muslim social activists, was viewed by many Hindus as an appeasement of Muslims and later became a leading cause for his assassination at the hands of intolerant Hindu extremists.

While Gandhi expressed mostly positive views of Islam, he did occasionally criticise Muslims. He stated in 1925 that he did not criticise the teachings of the Quran, but he did criticise the interpreters of the Quran. Gandhi believed that numerous interpreters have interpreted it to fit their preconceived notions. He believed Muslims should welcome criticism of the Quran, because "every true scripture only gains from criticism". Gandhi criticised Muslims who "betray intolerance of criticism by a non-Muslim of anything related to Islam", such as the penalty of stoning to death under Islamic law. To Gandhi, Islam has "nothing to fear from criticism even if it be unreasonable". He also believed there were material contradictions between Hinduism and Islam, and he criticised Muslims, along with communists, who were quick to resort to violence.

One of the strategies Gandhi adopted was to work with Muslim leaders of pre-partition India, to oppose the British imperialism in and outside the Indian subcontinent. After the First World War, in 1919–22, he won the Muslim leadership support of the Ali Brothers by backing the Khilafat Movement in favour of the Islamic Caliph and his historic Ottoman Caliphate, and opposing the secular Islam-supporting Mustafa Kemal Atatürk. By 1924, Atatürk had ended the Caliphate, the Khilafat Movement was over, and Muslim support for Gandhi had largely evaporated.

In 1925, Gandhi gave another reason for why he had got involved in the Khilafat movement and the Middle East affairs between Britain and the Ottoman Empire. Gandhi explained to his co-religionists (Hindus) that he sympathised and campaigned for the Islamic cause, not because he cared for the Sultan, but because "I wanted to enlist the Mussalman's sympathy in the matter of cow protection". According to the historian M. Naeem Qureshi, like the then Indian Muslim leaders who had combined religion and politics, Gandhi too imported his religion into his political strategy during the Khilafat movement.

In the 1940s, Gandhi pooled ideas with some Muslim leaders who sought religious harmony like him, and opposed the proposed partition of British India into India and Pakistan. For example, his close friend Badshah Khan suggested that they should work towards opening Hindu temples for Muslim prayers, and Islamic mosques for Hindu prayers, to bring the two religious groups closer. Gandhi accepted this and began having Muslim prayers read in Hindu temples to play his part, but was unable to get Hindu prayers read in mosques. The Hindu nationalist groups objected and began confronting Gandhi for this one-sided practice, by shouting and demonstrating inside the Hindu temples, in the last years of his life.

Christians 
Gandhi praised Christianity. He was critical of Christian missionary efforts in British India, because they mixed medical or education assistance with demands that the beneficiary convert to Christianity. According to Gandhi, this was not true "service" but one driven by an ulterior motive of luring people into religious conversion and exploiting the economically or medically desperate. It did not lead to inner transformation or moral advance or to the Christian teaching of "love", but was based on false one-sided criticisms of other religions, when Christian societies faced similar problems in South Africa and Europe. It led to the converted person hating his neighbours and other religions, and divided people rather than bringing them closer in compassion. According to Gandhi, "no religious tradition could claim a monopoly over truth or salvation". Gandhi did not support laws to prohibit missionary activity, but demanded that Christians should first understand the message of Jesus, and then strive to live without stereotyping and misrepresenting other religions. According to Gandhi, the message of Jesus was not to humiliate and imperialistically rule over other people considering them inferior or second class or slaves, but that "when the hungry are fed and peace comes to our individual and collective life, then Christ is born".

Gandhi believed that his long acquaintance with Christianity had made him like it as well as find it imperfect. He asked Christians to stop humiliating his country and his people as heathens, idolators and other abusive language, and to change their negative views of India. He believed that Christians should introspect on the "true meaning of religion" and get a desire to study and learn from Indian religions in the spirit of universal brotherhood. According to Eric Sharpe – a professor of Religious Studies, though Gandhi was born in a Hindu family and later became Hindu by conviction, many Christians in time thought of him as an "exemplary Christian and even as a saint".

Some colonial era Christian preachers and faithfuls considered Gandhi as a saint. Biographers from France and Britain have drawn parallels between Gandhi and Christian saints. Recent scholars question these romantic biographies and state that Gandhi was neither a Christian figure nor mirrored a Christian saint. Gandhi's life is better viewed as exemplifying his belief in the "convergence of various spiritualities" of a Christian and a Hindu, states Michael de Saint-Cheron.

Jews 
According to Kumaraswamy, Gandhi initially supported Arab demands with respect to Palestine. He justified this support by invoking Islam, stating that "non-Muslims cannot acquire sovereign jurisdiction" in Jazirat al-Arab (the Arabian Peninsula). These arguments, states Kumaraswamy, were a part of his political strategy to win Muslim support during the Khilafat movement. In the post-Khilafat period, Gandhi neither negated Jewish demands nor did he use Islamic texts or history to support Muslim claims against Israel. Gandhi's silence after the Khilafat period may represent an evolution in his understanding of the conflicting religious claims over Palestine, according to Kumaraswamy. In 1938, Gandhi spoke in favour of Jewish claims, and in March 1946, he said to the Member of British Parliament Sidney Silverman, "if the Arabs have a claim to Palestine, the Jews have a prior claim", a position very different from his earlier stance.

Gandhi discussed the persecution of the Jews in Germany and the emigration of Jews from Europe to Palestine through his lens of Satyagraha. In 1937, Gandhi discussed Zionism with his close Jewish friend Hermann Kallenbach. He said that Zionism was not the right answer to the problems faced by Jews and instead recommended Satyagraha. Gandhi thought the Zionists in Palestine represented European imperialism and used violence to achieve their goals; he argued that "the Jews should disclaim any intention of realising their aspiration under the protection of arms and should rely wholly on the goodwill of Arabs. No exception can possibly be taken to the natural desire of the Jews to find a home in Palestine. But they must wait for its fulfilment till Arab opinion is ripe for it."

In 1938, Gandhi stated that his "sympathies are all with the Jews. I have known them intimately in South Africa. Some of them became life-long companions." Philosopher Martin Buber was highly critical of Gandhi's approach and in 1939 wrote an open letter to him on the subject. Gandhi reiterated his stance that "the Jews seek to convert the Arab heart", and use "satyagraha in confronting the Arabs" in 1947. According to Simone Panter-Brick, Gandhi's political position on Jewish-Arab conflict evolved over the 1917–1947 period, shifting from a support for the Arab position first, and for the Jewish position in the 1940s.

On life, society and other application of his ideas

Vegetarianism, food, and animals 
Gandhi was brought up as a vegetarian by his devout Hindu mother. The idea of vegetarianism is deeply ingrained in Hindu Vaishnavism and Jain traditions in India, such as in his native Gujarat, where meat is considered as a form of food obtained by violence to animals. Gandhi's rationale for vegetarianism was largely along those found in Hindu and Jain texts. Gandhi believed that any form of food inescapably harms some form of living organism, but one should seek to understand and reduce the violence in what one consumes because "there is essential unity of all life".

Gandhi believed that some life forms are more capable of suffering, and non-violence to him meant not having the intent as well as active efforts to minimise hurt, injury or suffering to all life forms. Gandhi explored food sources that reduced violence to various life forms in the food chain. He believed that slaughtering animals is unnecessary, as other sources of foods are available. He also consulted with vegetarianism campaigners during his lifetime, such as with Henry Stephens Salt. Food to Gandhi was not only a source of sustaining one's body, but a source of his impact on other living beings, and one that affected his mind, character and spiritual well being. He avoided not only meat, but also eggs and milk. Gandhi wrote the book The Moral Basis of Vegetarianism and wrote for the London Vegetarian Society's publication.

Beyond his religious beliefs, Gandhi stated another motivation for his experiments with diet. He attempted to find the most non-violent vegetarian meal that the poorest human could afford, taking meticulous notes on vegetables and fruits, and his observations with his own body and his ashram in Gujarat. He tried fresh and dry fruits (fruitarianism), then just sun dried fruits, before resuming his prior vegetarian diet on advice of his doctor and concerns of his friends. His experiments with food began in the 1890s and continued for several decades. For some of these experiments, Gandhi combined his own ideas with those found on diet in Indian yoga texts. He believed that each vegetarian should experiment with their diet because, in his studies at his ashram he saw "one man's food may be poison for another".

Gandhi championed animal rights in general. Other than making vegetarian choices, he actively campaigned against dissection studies and experimentation on live animals (vivisection) in the name of science and medical studies. He considered it a violence against animals, something that inflicted pain and suffering. He wrote, "Vivisection in my opinion is the blackest of all the blackest crimes that man is at present committing against God and His fair creation."

Fasting 

Gandhi used fasting as a political device, often threatening suicide unless demands were met. Congress publicised the fasts as a political action that generated widespread sympathy. In response, the government tried to manipulate news coverage to minimise his challenge to the Raj. He fasted in 1932 to protest the voting scheme for separate political representation for Dalits; Gandhi did not want them segregated. The British government stopped the London press from showing photographs of his emaciated body, because it would elicit sympathy. Gandhi's 1943 hunger strike took place during a two-year prison term for the anti-colonial Quit India movement. The government called on nutritional experts to demystify his action, and again no photos were allowed. However, his final fast in 1948, after the end of British rule in India, his hunger strike was lauded by the British press and this time did include full-length photos.

Alter states that Gandhi's fasting, vegetarianism and diet was more than a political leverage, it was a part of his experiments with self restraint and healthy living. He was "profoundly skeptical of traditional Ayurveda", encouraging it to study the scientific method and adopt its progressive learning approach. Gandhi believed yoga offered health benefits. He believed that a healthy nutritional diet based on regional foods and hygiene were essential to good health. Recently ICMR made Gandhi's health records public in a book 'Gandhi and Health@150'. These records indicate that despite being underweight at 46.7 kg Gandhi was generally healthy. He avoided modern medication and experimented extensively with water and earth healing. While his cardio records show his heart was normal, there were several instances he suffered from ailments like Malaria and was also operated on twice for piles and appendicitis. Despite health challenges, Gandhi was able to walk about 79000 km in his lifetime which comes to an average of 18 km per day and is equivalent to walking around the earth twice.

Women 
Gandhi strongly favoured the emancipation of women, and urged "the women to fight for their own self-development." He opposed purdah, child marriage, dowry and sati. A wife is not a slave of the husband, stated Gandhi, but his comrade, better half, colleague and friend, according to Lyn Norvell. In his own life however, according to Suruchi Thapar-Bjorkert, Gandhi's relationship with his wife were at odds with some of these values.

At various occasions, Gandhi credited his orthodox Hindu mother, and his wife, for first lessons in satyagraha. He used the legends of Hindu goddess Sita to expound women's innate strength, autonomy and "lioness in spirit" whose moral compass can make any demon "as helpless as a goat". To Gandhi, the women of India were an important part of the "swadeshi movement" (Buy Indian), and his goal of decolonising the Indian economy.

Some historians such as Angela Woollacott and Kumari Jayawardena state that even though Gandhi often and publicly expressed his belief in the equality of sexes, yet his vision was one of gender difference and complementarity between them. Women, to Gandhi, should be educated to be better in the domestic realm and educate the next generation. His views on women's rights were less liberal and more similar to puritan-Victorian expectations of women, states Jayawardena, than other Hindu leaders with him who supported economic independence and equal gender rights in all aspects.

Brahmacharya: abstinence from sex and food 
Along with many other texts, Gandhi studied Bhagavad Gita while in South Africa. This Hindu scripture discusses jnana yoga, bhakti yoga and karma yoga along with virtues such as non-violence, patience, integrity, lack of hypocrisy, self restraint and abstinence. Gandhi began experiments with these, and in 1906 at age 37, although married and a father, he vowed to abstain from sexual relations.

Gandhi's experiment with abstinence went beyond sex, and extended to food. He consulted the Jain scholar Rajchandra, whom he fondly called Raychandbhai. Rajchandra advised him that milk stimulated sexual passion. Gandhi began abstaining from cow's milk in 1912, and did so even when doctors advised him to consume milk. According to Sankar Ghose, Tagore described Gandhi as someone who did not abhor sex or women, but considered sexual life as inconsistent with his moral goals.

Gandhi tried to test and prove to himself his brahmacharya. The experiments began some time after the death of his wife in February 1944. At the start of his experiment, he had women sleep in the same room but in different beds. He later slept with women in the same bed but clothed, and finally, he slept naked with women. In April 1945, Gandhi referenced being naked with several "women or girls" in a letter to Birla as part of the experiments. According to the 1960s memoir of his grandniece Manu, Gandhi feared in early 1947 that he and she may be killed by Muslims in the run-up to India's independence in August 1947, and asked her when she was 18 years old if she wanted to help him with his experiments to test their "purity", for which she readily accepted. Gandhi slept naked in the same bed with Manu with the bedroom doors open all night. Manu stated that the experiment had no "ill effect" on her. Gandhi also shared his bed with 18-year-old Abha, wife of his grandnephew Kanu. Gandhi would sleep with both Manu and Abha at the same time. None of the women who participated in the brahmachari experiments of Gandhi indicated that they had sex or that Gandhi behaved in any sexual way. Those who went public said they felt as though they were sleeping with their ageing mother.

According to Sean Scalmer, Gandhi in his final year of life was an ascetic, and his sickly skeletal figure was caricatured in Western media. In February 1947, he asked his confidants such as Birla and Ramakrishna if it was wrong for him to experiment his brahmacharya oath. Gandhi's public experiments, as they progressed, were widely discussed and criticised by his family members and leading politicians. However, Gandhi said that if he would not let Manu sleep with him, it would be a sign of weakness. Some of his staff resigned, including two of his newspaper's editors who had refused to print some of Gandhi's sermons dealing with his experiments. Nirmalkumar Bose, Gandhi's Bengali interpreter, for example, criticised Gandhi, not because Gandhi did anything wrong, but because Bose was concerned about the psychological effect on the women who participated in his experiments. Veena Howard states Gandhi's views on brahmacharya and religious renunciation experiments were a method to confront women issues in his times.

Untouchability and castes 
Gandhi spoke out against untouchability early in his life. Before 1932, he and his associates used the word antyaja for untouchables. In a major speech on untouchability at Nagpur in 1920, Gandhi called it a great evil in Hindu society but observed that it was not unique to Hinduism, having deeper roots, and stated that Europeans in South Africa treated "all of us, Hindus and Muslims, as untouchables; we may not reside in their midst, nor enjoy the rights which they do". Calling the doctrine of untouchability intolerable, he asserted that the practice could be eradicated, that Hinduism was flexible enough to allow eradication, and that a concerted effort was needed to persuade people of the wrong and to urge them to eradicate it.

According to Christophe Jaffrelot, while Gandhi considered untouchability to be wrong and evil, he believed that caste or class is based on neither inequality nor inferiority. Gandhi believed that individuals should freely intermarry whomever they wish, but that no one should expect everyone to be his friend: every individual, regardless of background, has a right to choose whom he will welcome into his home, whom he will befriend, and whom he will spend time with.

In 1932, Gandhi began a new campaign to improve the lives of the untouchables, whom he began to call harijans, "the children of god". On 8 May 1933, Gandhi began a 21-day fast of self-purification and launched a year-long campaign to help the harijan movement. This campaign was not universally embraced by the Dalit community: Ambedkar and his allies felt Gandhi was being paternalistic and was undermining Dalit political rights. Ambedkar described him as "devious and untrustworthy". He accused Gandhi as someone who wished to retain the caste system. Ambedkar and Gandhi debated their ideas and concerns, each trying to persuade the other. It was during the Harijan tour that he faced the first assassination attempt. While in Poona, a bomb was thrown by an unidentified assailant (described only as a sanatani in the press) at a car belonging to his entourage but Gandhi and his family escaped as they were in the car that was following. Gandhi later declared that he "cannot believe that any sane sanatanist could ever encourage the insane act ... The sorrowful incident has undoubtedly advanced the Harijan cause. It is easy to see that causes prosper by the martyrdom of those who stand for them."

In 1935, Ambedkar announced his intentions to leave Hinduism and join Buddhism. According to Sankar Ghose, the announcement shook Gandhi, who reappraised his views and wrote many essays with his views on castes, intermarriage, and what Hinduism says on the subject. These views contrasted with those of Ambedkar. Yet in the elections of 1937, excepting some seats in Mumbai which Ambedkar's party won, India's untouchables voted heavily in favour of Gandhi's campaign and his party, the Congress.

Gandhi and his associates continued to keep in touch with Ambedkar. Ambedkar worked with other Congress leaders through the 1940s and the headed committee of India's constitution in the late 1940s, but did indeed convert to Buddhism in 1956. According to Jaffrelot, Gandhi's views evolved between the 1920s and 1940s; by 1946, he actively encouraged intermarriage between castes. His approach, too, to untouchability differed from Ambedkar's, championing fusion, choice, and free intermixing, while Ambedkar envisioned each segment of society maintaining its group identity, and each group then separately advancing the "politics of equality".

Ambedkar's criticism of Gandhi continued to influence the Dalit movement past Gandhi's death. According to Arthur Herman, Ambedkar's hatred for Gandhi and Gandhi's ideas was so strong that, when he heard of Gandhi's assassination, he remarked after a momentary silence a sense of regret and then added, "My real enemy is gone; thank goodness the eclipse is over now". According to Ramachandra Guha, "ideologues have carried these old rivalries into the present, with the demonization of Gandhi now common among politicians who presume to speak in Ambedkar's name."

Nai Talim, basic education 

Gandhi rejected the colonial Western format of the education system. He stated that it led to disdain for manual work, generally created an elite administrative bureaucracy. Gandhi favoured an education system with far greater emphasis on learning skills in practical and useful work, one that included physical, mental and spiritual studies. His methodology sought to treat all professions equal and pay everyone the same. This leads him to create a university in Ahmedabad, Gujarat Vidyapith.

Gandhi called his ideas Nai Talim (literally, 'new education'). He believed that the Western style education violated and destroyed the indigenous cultures. A different basic education model, he believed, would lead to better self awareness, prepare people to treat all work equally respectable and valued, and lead to a society with less social diseases.

Nai Talim evolved out of his experiences at the Tolstoy Farm in South Africa, and Gandhi attempted to formulate the new system at the Sevagram ashram after 1937. Nehru government's vision of an industrialised, centrally planned economy after 1947 had scant place for Gandhi's village-oriented approach.

In his autobiography, Gandhi wrote that he believed every Hindu child must learn Sanskrit because its historic and spiritual texts are in that language.

Swaraj, self-rule 

Gandhi believed that swaraj not only can be attained with non-violence, but it can also be run with non-violence. A military is unnecessary, because any aggressor can be thrown out using the method of non-violent non-co-operation. While the military is unnecessary in a nation organised under swaraj principle, Gandhi added that a police force is necessary given human nature. However, the state would limit the use of weapons by the police to the minimum, aiming for their use as a restraining force.

According to Gandhi, a non-violent state is like an "ordered anarchy". In a society of mostly non-violent individuals, those who are violent will sooner or later accept discipline or leave the community, stated Gandhi. He emphasised a society where individuals believed more in learning about their duties and responsibilities, not demanded rights and privileges. On returning from South Africa, when Gandhi received a letter asking for his participation in writing a world charter for human rights, he responded saying, "in my experience, it is far more important to have a charter for human duties."

Swaraj to Gandhi did not mean transferring colonial era British power brokering system, favours-driven, bureaucratic, class exploitative structure and mindset into Indian hands. He warned such a transfer would still be English rule, just without the Englishman. "This is not the Swaraj I want", said Gandhi. Tewari states that Gandhi saw democracy as more than a system of government; it meant promoting both individuality and the self-discipline of the community. Democracy meant settling disputes in a nonviolent manner; it required freedom of thought and expression. For Gandhi, democracy was a way of life.

Hindu nationalism and revivalism 
Some scholars state Gandhi supported a religiously diverse India, while others state that the Muslim leaders who championed the partition and creation of a separate Muslim Pakistan considered Gandhi to be Hindu nationalist or revivalist. For example, in his letters to Mohammad Iqbal, Jinnah accused Gandhi to be favouring a Hindu rule and revivalism, that Gandhi led Indian National Congress was a fascist party.

In an interview with C.F. Andrews, Gandhi stated that if we believe all religions teach the same message of love and peace between all human beings, then there is neither any rationale nor need for proselytisation or attempts to convert people from one religion to another. Gandhi opposed missionary organisations who criticised Indian religions then attempted to convert followers of Indian religions to Islam or Christianity. In Gandhi's view, those who attempt to convert a Hindu, "they must harbour in their breasts the belief that Hinduism is an error" and that their own religion is "the only true religion". Gandhi believed that people who demand religious respect and rights must also show the same respect and grant the same rights to followers of other religions. He stated that spiritual studies must encourage "a Hindu to become a better Hindu, a Mussalman to become a better Mussalman, and a Christian a better Christian."

According to Gandhi, religion is not about what a man believes, it is about how a man lives, how he relates to other people, his conduct towards others, and one's relationship to one's conception of god. It is not important to convert or to join any religion, but it is important to improve one's way of life and conduct by absorbing ideas from any source and any religion, believed Gandhi.

Gandhian economics 

Gandhi believed in the sarvodaya economic model, which literally means "welfare, upliftment of all". This, states Bhatt, was a very different economic model than the socialism model championed and followed by free India by Nehru – India's first prime minister. To both, according to Bhatt, removing poverty and unemployment were the objective, but the Gandhian economic and development approach preferred adapting technology and infrastructure to suit the local situation, in contrast to Nehru's large scale, socialised state owned enterprises.

To Gandhi, the economic philosophy that aims at "greatest good for the greatest number" was fundamentally flawed, and his alternative proposal sarvodaya set its aim at the "greatest good for all". He believed that the best economic system not only cared to lift the "poor, less skilled, of impoverished background" but also empowered to lift the "rich, highly skilled, of capital means and landlords". Violence against any human being, born poor or rich, is wrong, believed Gandhi. He stated that the mandate theory of majoritarian democracy should not be pushed to absurd extremes, individual freedoms should never be denied, and no person should ever be made a social or economic slave to the "resolutions of majorities".

Gandhi challenged Nehru and the modernisers in the late 1930s who called for rapid industrialisation on the Soviet model; Gandhi denounced that as dehumanising and contrary to the needs of the villages where the great majority of the people lived. After Gandhi's assassination, Nehru led India in accordance with his personal socialist convictions. Historian Kuruvilla Pandikattu says "it was Nehru's vision, not Gandhi's, that was eventually preferred by the Indian State."

Gandhi called for ending poverty through improved agriculture and small-scale cottage rural industries. Gandhi's economic thinking disagreed with Marx, according to the political theory scholar and economist Bhikhu Parekh. Gandhi refused to endorse the view that economic forces are best understood as "antagonistic class interests". He argued that no man can degrade or brutalise the other without degrading and brutalising himself and that sustainable economic growth comes from service, not from exploitation. Further, believed Gandhi, in a free nation, victims exist only when they co-operate with their oppressor, and an economic and political system that offered increasing alternatives gave power of choice to the poorest man.

While disagreeing with Nehru about the socialist economic model, Gandhi also critiqued capitalism that was driven by endless wants and a materialistic view of man. This, he believed, created a vicious vested system of materialism at the cost of other human needs, such as spirituality and social relationships. To Gandhi, states Parekh, both communism and capitalism were wrong, in part because both focused exclusively on a materialistic view of man, and because the former deified the state with unlimited power of violence, while the latter deified capital. He believed that a better economic system is one which does not impoverish one's culture and spiritual pursuits.

Gandhism 

Gandhism designates the ideas and principles Gandhi promoted; of central importance is nonviolent resistance. A Gandhian can mean either an individual who follows, or a specific philosophy which is attributed to, Gandhism. M. M. Sankhdher argues that Gandhism is not a systematic position in metaphysics or in political philosophy. Rather, it is a political creed, an economic doctrine, a religious outlook, a moral precept, and especially, a humanitarian world view. It is an effort not to systematise wisdom but to transform society and is based on an undying faith in the goodness of human nature. However Gandhi himself did not approve of the notion of "Gandhism", as he explained in 1936:

Literary works 

Gandhi was a prolific writer. His signature style was simple, precise, clear and as devoid of artificialities. One of Gandhi's earliest publications, Hind Swaraj, published in Gujarati in 1909, became "the intellectual blueprint" for India's independence movement. The book was translated into English the next year, with a copyright legend that read "No Rights Reserved". For decades he edited several newspapers including Harijan in Gujarati, in Hindi and in the English language; Indian Opinion while in South Africa and, Young India, in English, and Navajivan, a Gujarati monthly, on his return to India. Later, Navajivan was also published in Hindi. In addition, he wrote letters almost every day to individuals and newspapers.

Gandhi also wrote several books including his autobiography, The Story of My Experiments with Truth (Gujarātī "સત્યના પ્રયોગો અથવા આત્મકથા"), of which he bought the entire first edition to make sure it was reprinted. His other autobiographies included: Satyagraha in South Africa about his struggle there, Hind Swaraj or Indian Home Rule, a political pamphlet, and a paraphrase in Gujarati of John Ruskin's Unto This Last which was an early critique of political economy. This last essay can be considered his programme on economics. He also wrote extensively on vegetarianism, diet and health, religion, social reforms, etc. Gandhi usually wrote in Gujarati, though he also revised the Hindi and English translations of his books. In 1934, he wrote Songs from Prison while prisoned in Yerawada jail in Maharashtra.

Gandhi's complete works were published by the Indian government under the name The Collected Works of Mahatma Gandhi in the 1960s. The writings comprise about 50,000 pages published in about a hundred volumes. In 2000, a revised edition of the complete works sparked a controversy, as it contained a large number of errors and omissions. The Indian government later withdrew the revised edition.

Legacy 

Gandhi is noted as the greatest figure of the successful Indian independence movement against the British rule. He is also hailed as the greatest figure of modern India. American historian Stanley Wolpert described Gandhi as "India's greatest revolutionary nationalist leader" and the greatest Indian since the Buddha. In 1999, Gandhi was named "Asian of the century" by Asiaweek. In a 2000 BBC poll, he was voted as the greatest man of the millennium.

The word Mahatma, while often mistaken for Gandhi's given name in the West, is taken from the Sanskrit words maha (meaning Great) and atma (meaning Soul). He was publicly bestowed with the honorific title "Mahatma" in July 1914 at farewell meeting in Town Hall, Durban. Rabindranath Tagore is said to have accorded the title to Gandhi by 1915. In his autobiography, Gandhi nevertheless explains that he never valued the title, and was often pained by it.

Innumerable streets, roads and localities in India are named after Gandhi. These include M.G.Road (the main street of a number of Indian cities including Mumbai, Bangalore, Kolkata, Lucknow, Kanpur, Gangtok and Indore), Gandhi Market (near Sion, Mumbai) and Gandhinagar (the capital of the state of Gujarat, Gandhi's birthplace).

As of 2008, over 150 countries released stamps on Gandhi. In October 2019, about 87 countries including Russia, Iran, Turkey, Uzbekistan, Palestine released commemorative Gandhi stamps on 150th birth anniversary of Gandhi.

Florian asteroid 120461 Gandhi was named in his honour in September 2020. In October 2022, a statue of Gandhi was installed in Astana on the embankment of the rowing canal, opposite the cult monument to the defenders of Kazakhstan.

On 15 December 2022, the United Nations headquarters in New York unveiled the statue of Gandhi. UN Secretary-General António Guterres called Gandhi an "uncompromising advocate for peaceful co-existence".

Followers and international influence 

Gandhi influenced important leaders and political movements. Leaders of the civil rights movement in the United States, including Martin Luther King Jr., James Lawson, and James Bevel, drew from the writings of Gandhi in the development of their own theories about nonviolence. King said "Christ gave us the goals and Mahatma Gandhi the tactics." King sometimes referred to Gandhi as "the little brown saint." Anti-apartheid activist and former President of South Africa, Nelson Mandela, was inspired by Gandhi. Others include Steve Biko, Václav Havel, and Aung San Suu Kyi.

In his early years, the former President of South Africa Nelson Mandela was a follower of the nonviolent resistance philosophy of Gandhi. Bhana and Vahed commented on these events as "Gandhi inspired succeeding generations of South African activists seeking to end White rule. This legacy connects him to Nelson Mandela...in a sense, Mandela completed what Gandhi started."

Gandhi's life and teachings inspired many who specifically referred to Gandhi as their mentor or who dedicated their lives to spreading Gandhi's ideas. In Europe, Romain Rolland was the first to discuss Gandhi in his 1924 book Mahatma Gandhi, and Brazilian anarchist and feminist Maria Lacerda de Moura wrote about Gandhi in her work on pacifism. In 1931, physicist Albert Einstein exchanged letters with Gandhi, and called him "a role model for the generations to come" in a letter writing about him. Einstein said of Gandhi:

Mahatma Gandhi's life achievement stands unique in political history. He has invented a completely new and humane means for the liberation war of an oppressed country, and practised it with greatest energy and devotion. The moral influence he had on the consciously thinking human being of the entire civilised world will probably be much more lasting than it seems in our time with its overestimation of brutal violent forces. Because lasting will only be the work of such statesmen who wake up and strengthen the moral power of their people through their example and educational works. We may all be happy and grateful that destiny gifted us with such an enlightened contemporary, a role model for the generations to come.

Generations to come will scarce believe that such a one as this walked the earth in flesh and blood.

Farah Omar, a political activist from Somaliland visited India in 1930, where he met Gandhi and was influenced by Gandhi's non-violent philosophy which he adopted in his campaign in British Somaliland.

Lanza del Vasto went to India in 1936 intending to live with Gandhi; he later returned to Europe to spread Gandhi's philosophy and founded the Community of the Ark in 1948 (modelled after Gandhi's ashrams). Madeleine Slade (known as "Mirabehn") was the daughter of a British admiral who spent much of her adult life in India as a devotee of Gandhi.

In addition, the British musician John Lennon referred to Gandhi when discussing his views on nonviolence. In 2007, former US Vice-President and environmentalist Al Gore drew upon Gandhi's idea of satyagraha in a speech on climate change.

US President Barack Obama said in a 2010 address to the Parliament of India that:

I am mindful that I might not be standing before you today, as President of the United States, had it not been for Gandhi and the message he shared with America and the world.

Obama said in September 2009 that his biggest inspiration came from Gandhi. His reply was in response to the question "Who was the one person, dead or live, that you would choose to dine with?". He continued that "He's somebody I find a lot of inspiration in. He inspired Dr. King with his message of nonviolence. He ended up doing so much and changed the world just by the power of his ethics."

Time magazine named The 14th Dalai Lama, Lech Wałęsa, Martin Luther King Jr., Cesar Chavez, Aung San Suu Kyi, Benigno Aquino Jr., Desmond Tutu, and Nelson Mandela as Children of Gandhi and his spiritual heirs to nonviolence. The Mahatma Gandhi District in Houston, Texas, United States, an ethnic Indian enclave, is officially named after Gandhi.

Gandhi's ideas had a significant influence on 20th-century philosophy. It began with his engagement with Romain Rolland and Martin Buber. Jean-Luc Nancy said that the French philosopher Maurice Blanchot engaged critically with Gandhi from the point of view of "European spirituality". Since then philosophers including Hannah Arendt, Etienne Balibar and Slavoj Žižek found that Gandhi was a necessary reference to discuss morality in politics. Recently in the light of climate change Gandhi's views on technology are gaining importance in the fields of environmental philosophy and philosophy of technology.

Global days that celebrate Gandhi 
In 2007, the United Nations General Assembly declared Gandhi's birthday 2 October as "the International Day of Nonviolence." First proposed by UNESCO in 1948, as the School Day of Nonviolence and Peace (DENIP in Spanish), 30 January is observed as the School Day of Nonviolence and Peace in schools of many countries In countries with a Southern Hemisphere school calendar, it is observed on 30 March.

Awards 

Time magazine named Gandhi the Man of the Year in 1930. In the same magazine's 1999 list of The Most Important People of the Century, Gandhi was second only to Albert Einstein, who had called Gandhi "the greatest man of our age". The University of Nagpur awarded him an LL.D. in 1937. The Government of India awarded the annual Gandhi Peace Prize to distinguished social workers, world leaders and citizens. Nelson Mandela, the leader of South Africa's struggle to eradicate racial discrimination and segregation, was a prominent non-Indian recipient. In 2011, Gandhi topped the TIME's list of top 25 political icons of all time.

Gandhi did not receive the Nobel Peace Prize, although he was nominated five times between 1937 and 1948, including the first-ever nomination by the American Friends Service Committee, though he made the short list only twice, in 1937 and 1947. Decades later, the Nobel Committee publicly declared its regret for the omission, and admitted to deeply divided nationalistic opinion denying the award. Gandhi was nominated in 1948 but was assassinated before nominations closed. That year, the committee chose not to award the peace prize stating that "there was no suitable living candidate" and later research shows that the possibility of awarding the prize posthumously to Gandhi was discussed and that the reference to no suitable living candidate was to Gandhi. Geir Lundestad, Secretary of Norwegian Nobel Committee in 2006 said, "The greatest omission in our 106-year history is undoubtedly that Mahatma Gandhi never received the Nobel Peace prize. Gandhi could do without the Nobel Peace prize, whether Nobel committee can do without Gandhi is the question". When the 14th Dalai Lama was awarded the Prize in 1989, the chairman of the committee said that this was "in part a tribute to the memory of Mahatma Gandhi". In the summer of 1995, the North American Vegetarian Society inducted him posthumously into the Vegetarian Hall of Fame.

Father of the Nation 
Indians widely describe Gandhi as the father of the nation. Origin of this title is traced back to a radio address (on Singapore radio) on 6 July 1944 by Subhash Chandra Bose where Bose addressed Gandhi as "The Father of the Nation". On 28 April 1947, Sarojini Naidu during a conference also referred Gandhi as "Father of the Nation". He is also conferred the title "Bapu" (Gujarati: endearment for father, papa).

Film, theatre and literature 
A five-hour nine-minute long biographical documentary film, Mahatma: Life of Gandhi, 1869–1948, made by Vithalbhai Jhaveri in 1968, quoting Gandhi's words and using black and white archival footage and photographs, captures the history of those times. Ben Kingsley portrayed him in Richard Attenborough's 1982 film Gandhi, which won the Academy Award for Best Picture. It was based on the biography by Louis Fischer. The 1996 film The Making of the Mahatma documented Gandhi's time in South Africa and his transformation from an inexperienced barrister to recognised political leader. Gandhi was a central figure in the 2006 Bollywood comedy film Lage Raho Munna Bhai. Jahnu Barua's Maine Gandhi Ko Nahin Mara (I did not kill Gandhi), places contemporary society as a backdrop with its vanishing memory of Gandhi's values as a metaphor for the senile forgetfulness of the protagonist of his 2005 film, writes Vinay Lal.

In 1967, Gandhi was set to be featured on the album cover of one of the best selling albums of The Beatles, Sgt. Pepper's Lonely Hearts Club Band, however this idea was later cancelled due to respect for Gandhi.

The 1979 opera Satyagraha by American composer Philip Glass is loosely based on Gandhi's life. The opera's libretto, taken from the Bhagavad Gita, is sung in the original Sanskrit.

The 1995 Marathi play Gandhi Virudh Gandhi explored the relationship between Gandhi and his son Harilal. The 2007 film, Gandhi, My Father was inspired on the same theme. The 1989 Marathi play Me Nathuram Godse Boltoy and the 1997 Hindi play Gandhi Ambedkar criticised Gandhi and his principles.

Several biographers have undertaken the task of describing Gandhi's life. Among them are D. G. Tendulkar with his Mahatma. Life of Mohandas Karamchand Gandhi in eight volumes, Chaman Nahal's Gandhi Quartet, and Pyarelal and Sushila Nayyar with their Mahatma Gandhi in 10 volumes. The 2010 biography, Great Soul: Mahatma Gandhi and His Struggle With India by Joseph Lelyveld contained controversial material speculating about Gandhi's sexual life. Lelyveld, however, stated that the press coverage "grossly distort[s]" the overall message of the book. The 2014 film Welcome Back Gandhi takes a fictionalised look at how Gandhi might react to modern day India. The 2019 play Bharat Bhagya Vidhata, inspired by Pujya Gurudevshri Rakeshbhai and produced by Sangeet Natak Akademi and Shrimad Rajchandra Mission Dharampur takes a look at how Gandhi cultivated the values of truth and non-violence.

"Mahatma Gandhi" is used by Cole Porter in his lyrics for the song You're the Top which is included in the 1934 musical Anything Goes. In the song, Porter rhymes "Mahatma Gandhi' with "Napoleon Brandy."

Current impact within India 

India, with its rapid economic modernisation and urbanisation, has rejected Gandhi's economics but accepted much of his politics and continues to revere his memory. Reporter Jim Yardley notes that, "modern India is hardly a Gandhian nation, if it ever was one. His vision of a village-dominated economy was shunted aside during his lifetime as rural romanticism, and his call for a national ethos of personal austerity and nonviolence has proved antithetical to the goals of an aspiring economic and military power." By contrast, Gandhi is "given full credit for India's political identity as a tolerant, secular democracy."

Gandhi's birthday, 2 October, is a national holiday in India, Gandhi Jayanti. Gandhi's image also appears on paper currency of all denominations issued by Reserve Bank of India, except for the one rupee note. Gandhi's date of death, 30 January, is commemorated as a Martyrs' Day in India.

There are three temples in India dedicated to Gandhi. One is located at Sambalpur in Odisha and the second at Nidaghatta village near Kadur in Chikmagalur district of Karnataka and the third one at Chityal in the district of Nalgonda, Telangana. The Gandhi Memorial in Kanyakumari resembles central Indian Hindu temples and the Tamukkam or Summer Palace in Madurai now houses the Mahatma Gandhi Museum.

Descendants 

Gandhi's children and grandchildren live in India and other countries. Grandson Rajmohan Gandhi is a professor in Illinois and an author of Gandhi's biography titled Mohandas, while another, Tarun Gandhi, has authored several authoritative books on his grandfather. Another grandson, Kanu Ramdas Gandhi (the son of Gandhi's third son Ramdas), was found living in an old age home in Delhi despite having taught earlier in the United States.

See also 

 Gandhi cap
 Gandhi Teerth – Gandhi International Research Institute and Museum for Gandhian study, research on Mahatma Gandhi and dialogue
 Inclusive Christianity
 List of civil rights leaders
 List of peace activists
 Seven Social Sins (a.k.a. Seven Blunders of the World)
 Trikaranasuddhi
 Composite nationalism

Notes

Explanatory notes

Citations

General and cited references

Books 

 Ahmed, Talat (2018). Mohandas Gandhi: Experiments in Civil Disobedience. .
  (see book article)
 
 Brown, Judith M. (2004). "Gandhi, Mohandas Karamchand [Mahatma Gandhi] (1869–1948)", Oxford Dictionary of National Biography, Oxford University Press.
 Brown, Judith M., and Anthony Parel, eds. The Cambridge Companion to Gandhi (2012); 14 essays by scholars
 
 
 
 Louis Fischer. The Life of Mahatma Gandhi (1957) online

 
 
 
 
 
 
 
 
 
 
 
 
 
 
 
 
 
 
 
 
 
 
 
 ; short biography for children

Scholarly articles 
 Danielson, Leilah C. "'In My Extremity I Turned to Gandhi': American Pacifists, Christianity, and Gandhian Nonviolence, 1915–1941". Church History 72.2 (2003): 361–388.
 Du Toit, Brian M. "The Mahatma Gandhi and South Africa." Journal of Modern African Studies 34#4 (1996): 643–660. .
 Gokhale, B. G. "Gandhi and the British Empire," History Today (Nov 1969), 19#11 pp 744–751 online.
 Juergensmeyer, Mark. "The Gandhi Revival – A Review Article." The Journal of Asian Studies 43#2 (Feb. 1984), pp. 293–298. 
 Kishwar, Madhu. "Gandhi on Women." Economic and Political Weekly 20, no. 41 (1985): 1753–758. .
 Murthy, C. S. H. N., Oinam Bedajit Meitei, and Dapkupar Tariang. "The Tale Of Gandhi Through The Lens: An Inter-Textual Analytical Study Of Three Major Films-Gandhi, The Making Of The Mahatma, And Gandhi, My Father." CINEJ Cinema Journal 2.2 (2013): 4–37. online
 Power, Paul F. "Toward a Revaluation of Gandhi's Political Thought." Western Political Quarterly 16.1 (1963): 99–108 excerpt.
 Rudolph, Lloyd I. "Gandhi in the Mind of America." Economic and Political Weekly 45, no. 47 (2010): 23–26. .

Primary sources 

 
 
 
 
 
 
  (100 volumes). Free online access from Gandhiserve.

External links 

 Gandhi's correspondence with the Indian government 1942–1944
 
 
 
 
 
 

 
1869 births
1948 deaths
19th-century Indian lawyers
19th-century Indian male writers
19th-century Indian philosophers
19th-century Indian writers
20th-century South African lawyers
20th-century Indian male writers
20th-century Indian philosophers
20th-century Indian writers
Alumni of the University of London
Alumni of University College London
Anti-imperialism
Anti–World War II activists
Articles containing video clips
Ascetics
Assassinated Indian politicians
British Empire in World War II
Colony of Natal people
Critics of political economy
Deaths by firearm in India
Founders of Indian schools and colleges
Gujarati-language writers
Gujarati people
Hindu pacifists
Hindu reformers
Human rights activists
Hunger strikers
Indian activist journalists
Indian animal rights activists
Indian anti-poverty advocates
Indian anti-war activists
Indian autobiographers
Indian barristers
Indian civil rights activists
Indian ethicists
Indian expatriates in South Africa
Indian expatriates in the United Kingdom
Indian Hindus
Indian humanitarians
Indian memoirists
Indian murder victims
Indian nationalists
Indian pacifists
Indian people of World War II
Indian political philosophers
Indian revolutionaries
Indian tax resisters
Indian vegetarianism activists
Mohandas Karamchand
Male murder victims
Members of the Inner Temple
Natal Indian Congress politicians
Neo-Vedanta
Nonviolence advocates
People convicted of sedition
People from Porbandar
People murdered in Delhi
People of the Second Boer War
Political prisoners
Presidents of the Indian National Congress
Prisoners and detainees of British India
Recipients of the Kaisar-i-Hind Medal
Simple living advocates
South African Indian Congress politicians
19th-century South African lawyers
Swadeshi activists
Time Person of the Year
Tolstoyans
Translators of the Bhagavad Gita
Writers about activism and social change
Writers from Gujarat
1940s assassinated politicians